

495001–495100 

|-bgcolor=#fefefe
| 495001 ||  || — || May 6, 2010 || Mount Lemmon || Mount Lemmon Survey ||  || align=right data-sort-value="0.77" | 770 m || 
|-id=002 bgcolor=#fefefe
| 495002 ||  || — || May 11, 2010 || Mount Lemmon || Mount Lemmon Survey ||  || align=right data-sort-value="0.56" | 560 m || 
|-id=003 bgcolor=#fefefe
| 495003 ||  || — || May 13, 2010 || Catalina || CSS ||  || align=right | 1.2 km || 
|-id=004 bgcolor=#fefefe
| 495004 ||  || — || May 22, 2010 || WISE || WISE ||  || align=right | 1.5 km || 
|-id=005 bgcolor=#fefefe
| 495005 ||  || — || May 31, 2010 || WISE || WISE || CHL || align=right | 1.3 km || 
|-id=006 bgcolor=#fefefe
| 495006 ||  || — || June 1, 2010 || WISE || WISE ||  || align=right | 1.3 km || 
|-id=007 bgcolor=#d6d6d6
| 495007 ||  || — || June 24, 2010 || WISE || WISE || YAK || align=right | 2.3 km || 
|-id=008 bgcolor=#fefefe
| 495008 ||  || — || June 23, 2010 || Mount Lemmon || Mount Lemmon Survey ||  || align=right | 1.9 km || 
|-id=009 bgcolor=#d6d6d6
| 495009 ||  || — || June 27, 2010 || WISE || WISE || SYL7:4 || align=right | 5.0 km || 
|-id=010 bgcolor=#fefefe
| 495010 ||  || — || June 18, 2010 || Mount Lemmon || Mount Lemmon Survey || MAS || align=right data-sort-value="0.65" | 650 m || 
|-id=011 bgcolor=#E9E9E9
| 495011 ||  || — || March 13, 2008 || Kitt Peak || Spacewatch || BRU || align=right | 2.2 km || 
|-id=012 bgcolor=#d6d6d6
| 495012 ||  || — || August 10, 2010 || Kitt Peak || Spacewatch ||  || align=right | 2.7 km || 
|-id=013 bgcolor=#fefefe
| 495013 ||  || — || August 10, 2010 || Kitt Peak || Spacewatch || NYS || align=right data-sort-value="0.68" | 680 m || 
|-id=014 bgcolor=#fefefe
| 495014 ||  || — || September 10, 2010 || Catalina || CSS ||  || align=right data-sort-value="0.78" | 780 m || 
|-id=015 bgcolor=#E9E9E9
| 495015 ||  || — || September 11, 2010 || La Sagra || OAM Obs. ||  || align=right | 1.1 km || 
|-id=016 bgcolor=#fefefe
| 495016 ||  || — || October 1, 1999 || Kitt Peak || Spacewatch || NYS || align=right data-sort-value="0.79" | 790 m || 
|-id=017 bgcolor=#E9E9E9
| 495017 ||  || — || September 12, 2010 || Mount Lemmon || Mount Lemmon Survey ||  || align=right | 1.3 km || 
|-id=018 bgcolor=#fefefe
| 495018 ||  || — || September 11, 2010 || La Sagra || OAM Obs. ||  || align=right data-sort-value="0.86" | 860 m || 
|-id=019 bgcolor=#E9E9E9
| 495019 ||  || — || September 14, 2010 || Kitt Peak || Spacewatch ||  || align=right | 1.2 km || 
|-id=020 bgcolor=#fefefe
| 495020 ||  || — || September 5, 2010 || Mount Lemmon || Mount Lemmon Survey || NYS || align=right data-sort-value="0.82" | 820 m || 
|-id=021 bgcolor=#FFC2E0
| 495021 ||  || — || September 29, 2010 || Mount Lemmon || Mount Lemmon Survey || AMOcritical || align=right data-sort-value="0.11" | 110 m || 
|-id=022 bgcolor=#E9E9E9
| 495022 ||  || — || October 3, 2010 || Kitt Peak || Spacewatch ||  || align=right | 1.8 km || 
|-id=023 bgcolor=#E9E9E9
| 495023 ||  || — || September 10, 2010 || Kitt Peak || Spacewatch ||  || align=right | 1.1 km || 
|-id=024 bgcolor=#E9E9E9
| 495024 ||  || — || October 28, 2010 || Kitt Peak || Spacewatch ||  || align=right | 1.9 km || 
|-id=025 bgcolor=#d6d6d6
| 495025 ||  || — || October 29, 2010 || Mount Lemmon || Mount Lemmon Survey ||  || align=right | 3.1 km || 
|-id=026 bgcolor=#d6d6d6
| 495026 ||  || — || October 13, 2010 || Mount Lemmon || Mount Lemmon Survey ||  || align=right | 2.1 km || 
|-id=027 bgcolor=#E9E9E9
| 495027 ||  || — || May 30, 2009 || Mount Lemmon || Mount Lemmon Survey ||  || align=right | 3.4 km || 
|-id=028 bgcolor=#E9E9E9
| 495028 ||  || — || August 19, 2010 || Kitt Peak || Spacewatch ||  || align=right | 1.4 km || 
|-id=029 bgcolor=#fefefe
| 495029 ||  || — || March 18, 2009 || Catalina || CSS || H || align=right data-sort-value="0.82" | 820 m || 
|-id=030 bgcolor=#E9E9E9
| 495030 ||  || — || October 12, 2010 || Mount Lemmon || Mount Lemmon Survey || EUN || align=right | 1.8 km || 
|-id=031 bgcolor=#E9E9E9
| 495031 ||  || — || October 19, 2010 || Mount Lemmon || Mount Lemmon Survey ||  || align=right | 1.3 km || 
|-id=032 bgcolor=#d6d6d6
| 495032 ||  || — || October 29, 2010 || Catalina || CSS ||  || align=right | 3.2 km || 
|-id=033 bgcolor=#d6d6d6
| 495033 ||  || — || September 11, 2010 || Mount Lemmon || Mount Lemmon Survey ||  || align=right | 2.8 km || 
|-id=034 bgcolor=#E9E9E9
| 495034 ||  || — || October 14, 2010 || Mount Lemmon || Mount Lemmon Survey ||  || align=right | 1.3 km || 
|-id=035 bgcolor=#E9E9E9
| 495035 ||  || — || November 2, 2010 || La Sagra || OAM Obs. ||  || align=right | 1.9 km || 
|-id=036 bgcolor=#d6d6d6
| 495036 ||  || — || October 11, 2010 || Mount Lemmon || Mount Lemmon Survey ||  || align=right | 2.3 km || 
|-id=037 bgcolor=#C2FFFF
| 495037 ||  || — || September 7, 2008 || Mount Lemmon || Mount Lemmon Survey || L4 || align=right | 7.2 km || 
|-id=038 bgcolor=#fefefe
| 495038 ||  || — || May 13, 2009 || Kitt Peak || Spacewatch || H || align=right data-sort-value="0.76" | 760 m || 
|-id=039 bgcolor=#E9E9E9
| 495039 ||  || — || November 1, 2010 || Kitt Peak || Spacewatch ||  || align=right | 2.2 km || 
|-id=040 bgcolor=#d6d6d6
| 495040 ||  || — || November 11, 2010 || Mount Lemmon || Mount Lemmon Survey || HYG || align=right | 2.5 km || 
|-id=041 bgcolor=#E9E9E9
| 495041 ||  || — || October 14, 2010 || Mount Lemmon || Mount Lemmon Survey ||  || align=right data-sort-value="0.89" | 890 m || 
|-id=042 bgcolor=#E9E9E9
| 495042 ||  || — || November 2, 2010 || Kitt Peak || Spacewatch ||  || align=right | 1.3 km || 
|-id=043 bgcolor=#E9E9E9
| 495043 ||  || — || December 5, 2010 || Mount Lemmon || Mount Lemmon Survey ||  || align=right | 1.2 km || 
|-id=044 bgcolor=#E9E9E9
| 495044 ||  || — || December 4, 2010 || Mount Lemmon || Mount Lemmon Survey ||  || align=right | 2.4 km || 
|-id=045 bgcolor=#d6d6d6
| 495045 ||  || — || March 25, 2006 || Kitt Peak || Spacewatch ||  || align=right | 2.4 km || 
|-id=046 bgcolor=#d6d6d6
| 495046 ||  || — || January 28, 2011 || Mount Lemmon || Mount Lemmon Survey || TIR || align=right | 3.1 km || 
|-id=047 bgcolor=#d6d6d6
| 495047 ||  || — || January 26, 2011 || Mount Lemmon || Mount Lemmon Survey ||  || align=right | 1.7 km || 
|-id=048 bgcolor=#d6d6d6
| 495048 ||  || — || January 27, 2011 || Kitt Peak || Spacewatch ||  || align=right | 1.8 km || 
|-id=049 bgcolor=#d6d6d6
| 495049 ||  || — || January 26, 2006 || Kitt Peak || Spacewatch || EOS || align=right | 2.4 km || 
|-id=050 bgcolor=#d6d6d6
| 495050 ||  || — || December 10, 2010 || Mount Lemmon || Mount Lemmon Survey ||  || align=right | 2.2 km || 
|-id=051 bgcolor=#d6d6d6
| 495051 ||  || — || February 21, 2006 || Catalina || CSS ||  || align=right | 2.2 km || 
|-id=052 bgcolor=#E9E9E9
| 495052 ||  || — || September 14, 2009 || Kitt Peak || Spacewatch ||  || align=right | 1.8 km || 
|-id=053 bgcolor=#d6d6d6
| 495053 ||  || — || January 4, 2011 || Mount Lemmon || Mount Lemmon Survey ||  || align=right | 2.3 km || 
|-id=054 bgcolor=#E9E9E9
| 495054 ||  || — || November 13, 2010 || Kitt Peak || Spacewatch ||  || align=right | 2.7 km || 
|-id=055 bgcolor=#d6d6d6
| 495055 ||  || — || February 4, 2011 || Haleakala || Pan-STARRS ||  || align=right | 2.7 km || 
|-id=056 bgcolor=#d6d6d6
| 495056 ||  || — || January 30, 2011 || Haleakala || Pan-STARRS || EOS || align=right | 2.6 km || 
|-id=057 bgcolor=#d6d6d6
| 495057 ||  || — || January 30, 2011 || Haleakala || Pan-STARRS ||  || align=right | 2.4 km || 
|-id=058 bgcolor=#d6d6d6
| 495058 ||  || — || January 28, 2011 || Kitt Peak || Spacewatch || EOS || align=right | 2.4 km || 
|-id=059 bgcolor=#d6d6d6
| 495059 ||  || — || February 5, 2006 || Mount Lemmon || Mount Lemmon Survey || KOR || align=right | 1.9 km || 
|-id=060 bgcolor=#d6d6d6
| 495060 ||  || — || March 24, 2006 || Mount Lemmon || Mount Lemmon Survey ||  || align=right | 2.0 km || 
|-id=061 bgcolor=#d6d6d6
| 495061 ||  || — || February 5, 2011 || Catalina || CSS ||  || align=right | 2.3 km || 
|-id=062 bgcolor=#d6d6d6
| 495062 ||  || — || November 20, 2009 || Kitt Peak || Spacewatch ||  || align=right | 3.2 km || 
|-id=063 bgcolor=#d6d6d6
| 495063 ||  || — || March 23, 2006 || Kitt Peak || Spacewatch ||  || align=right | 1.9 km || 
|-id=064 bgcolor=#E9E9E9
| 495064 ||  || — || March 10, 2011 || Kitt Peak || Spacewatch ||  || align=right | 1.9 km || 
|-id=065 bgcolor=#d6d6d6
| 495065 ||  || — || January 26, 2010 || WISE || WISE || Tj (2.93) || align=right | 3.2 km || 
|-id=066 bgcolor=#d6d6d6
| 495066 ||  || — || January 13, 2005 || Kitt Peak || Spacewatch || HYG || align=right | 2.7 km || 
|-id=067 bgcolor=#d6d6d6
| 495067 ||  || — || February 25, 2011 || Kitt Peak || Spacewatch ||  || align=right | 2.7 km || 
|-id=068 bgcolor=#d6d6d6
| 495068 ||  || — || March 1, 2011 || Mount Lemmon || Mount Lemmon Survey || HYG || align=right | 2.2 km || 
|-id=069 bgcolor=#d6d6d6
| 495069 ||  || — || May 1, 2006 || Kitt Peak || Spacewatch || THM || align=right | 2.1 km || 
|-id=070 bgcolor=#d6d6d6
| 495070 ||  || — || September 9, 2007 || Kitt Peak || Spacewatch ||  || align=right | 2.8 km || 
|-id=071 bgcolor=#d6d6d6
| 495071 ||  || — || January 11, 2011 || Kitt Peak || Spacewatch ||  || align=right | 3.8 km || 
|-id=072 bgcolor=#d6d6d6
| 495072 ||  || — || March 11, 2011 || Kitt Peak || Spacewatch || HYG || align=right | 2.3 km || 
|-id=073 bgcolor=#d6d6d6
| 495073 ||  || — || April 2, 2010 || WISE || WISE || EUP || align=right | 3.5 km || 
|-id=074 bgcolor=#d6d6d6
| 495074 ||  || — || April 11, 2011 || Mount Lemmon || Mount Lemmon Survey ||  || align=right | 2.8 km || 
|-id=075 bgcolor=#d6d6d6
| 495075 ||  || — || April 21, 2010 || WISE || WISE ||  || align=right | 3.3 km || 
|-id=076 bgcolor=#d6d6d6
| 495076 ||  || — || March 29, 2011 || Kitt Peak || Spacewatch ||  || align=right | 2.9 km || 
|-id=077 bgcolor=#d6d6d6
| 495077 ||  || — || April 6, 2011 || Mount Lemmon || Mount Lemmon Survey ||  || align=right | 3.1 km || 
|-id=078 bgcolor=#d6d6d6
| 495078 ||  || — || April 28, 2011 || Haleakala || Pan-STARRS ||  || align=right | 3.4 km || 
|-id=079 bgcolor=#d6d6d6
| 495079 ||  || — || February 27, 2010 || WISE || WISE || 7:4* || align=right | 2.0 km || 
|-id=080 bgcolor=#d6d6d6
| 495080 ||  || — || May 1, 2011 || Haleakala || Pan-STARRS ||  || align=right | 3.7 km || 
|-id=081 bgcolor=#E9E9E9
| 495081 ||  || — || April 11, 2011 || Mount Lemmon || Mount Lemmon Survey ||  || align=right | 1.2 km || 
|-id=082 bgcolor=#d6d6d6
| 495082 ||  || — || May 1, 2011 || Haleakala || Pan-STARRS || ALA || align=right | 4.0 km || 
|-id=083 bgcolor=#d6d6d6
| 495083 ||  || — || April 14, 2005 || Kitt Peak || Spacewatch || EUP || align=right | 3.5 km || 
|-id=084 bgcolor=#d6d6d6
| 495084 ||  || — || January 30, 2011 || Haleakala || Pan-STARRS || HYG || align=right | 3.2 km || 
|-id=085 bgcolor=#d6d6d6
| 495085 ||  || — || April 28, 2011 || Haleakala || Pan-STARRS ||  || align=right | 2.9 km || 
|-id=086 bgcolor=#d6d6d6
| 495086 ||  || — || April 24, 2011 || Haleakala || Pan-STARRS || 7:4* || align=right | 3.8 km || 
|-id=087 bgcolor=#fefefe
| 495087 ||  || — || March 15, 2010 || Kitt Peak || Spacewatch ||  || align=right data-sort-value="0.71" | 710 m || 
|-id=088 bgcolor=#fefefe
| 495088 ||  || — || September 18, 2011 || Haleakala || Pan-STARRS ||  || align=right | 1.1 km || 
|-id=089 bgcolor=#FA8072
| 495089 ||  || — || July 3, 2011 || Mount Lemmon || Mount Lemmon Survey ||  || align=right data-sort-value="0.54" | 540 m || 
|-id=090 bgcolor=#fefefe
| 495090 ||  || — || September 20, 2011 || Mount Lemmon || Mount Lemmon Survey ||  || align=right data-sort-value="0.57" | 570 m || 
|-id=091 bgcolor=#fefefe
| 495091 ||  || — || October 25, 2008 || Kitt Peak || Spacewatch ||  || align=right data-sort-value="0.58" | 580 m || 
|-id=092 bgcolor=#fefefe
| 495092 ||  || — || September 19, 2011 || Haleakala || Pan-STARRS ||  || align=right data-sort-value="0.83" | 830 m || 
|-id=093 bgcolor=#fefefe
| 495093 ||  || — || September 4, 2011 || Haleakala || Pan-STARRS ||  || align=right data-sort-value="0.64" | 640 m || 
|-id=094 bgcolor=#fefefe
| 495094 ||  || — || September 22, 2011 || Kitt Peak || Spacewatch ||  || align=right data-sort-value="0.72" | 720 m || 
|-id=095 bgcolor=#fefefe
| 495095 ||  || — || September 23, 2011 || Kitt Peak || Spacewatch ||  || align=right data-sort-value="0.70" | 700 m || 
|-id=096 bgcolor=#E9E9E9
| 495096 ||  || — || September 26, 2011 || Kitt Peak || Spacewatch || AEO || align=right | 1.5 km || 
|-id=097 bgcolor=#fefefe
| 495097 ||  || — || September 2, 2011 || Haleakala || Pan-STARRS ||  || align=right data-sort-value="0.73" | 730 m || 
|-id=098 bgcolor=#fefefe
| 495098 ||  || — || November 21, 2008 || Kitt Peak || Spacewatch ||  || align=right data-sort-value="0.52" | 520 m || 
|-id=099 bgcolor=#E9E9E9
| 495099 ||  || — || September 23, 2011 || Kitt Peak || Spacewatch ||  || align=right | 1.3 km || 
|-id=100 bgcolor=#fefefe
| 495100 ||  || — || October 20, 2011 || Kitt Peak || Spacewatch ||  || align=right data-sort-value="0.69" | 690 m || 
|}

495101–495200 

|-bgcolor=#E9E9E9
| 495101 ||  || — || September 22, 2011 || Catalina || CSS ||  || align=right | 1.5 km || 
|-id=102 bgcolor=#FFC2E0
| 495102 ||  || — || October 15, 2006 || San Marcello || Pistoia Mountains Obs. || APOfast? || align=right data-sort-value="0.63" | 630 m || 
|-id=103 bgcolor=#E9E9E9
| 495103 ||  || — || September 28, 2011 || Kitt Peak || Spacewatch || ADE || align=right data-sort-value="0.73" | 730 m || 
|-id=104 bgcolor=#fefefe
| 495104 ||  || — || October 24, 2011 || Kitt Peak || Spacewatch ||  || align=right data-sort-value="0.71" | 710 m || 
|-id=105 bgcolor=#E9E9E9
| 495105 ||  || — || October 25, 2011 || Haleakala || Pan-STARRS ||  || align=right | 1.3 km || 
|-id=106 bgcolor=#fefefe
| 495106 ||  || — || October 26, 2011 || Haleakala || Pan-STARRS ||  || align=right data-sort-value="0.93" | 930 m || 
|-id=107 bgcolor=#fefefe
| 495107 ||  || — || October 25, 2011 || Haleakala || Pan-STARRS ||  || align=right data-sort-value="0.61" | 610 m || 
|-id=108 bgcolor=#fefefe
| 495108 ||  || — || September 4, 2011 || Haleakala || Pan-STARRS ||  || align=right data-sort-value="0.66" | 660 m || 
|-id=109 bgcolor=#fefefe
| 495109 ||  || — || October 5, 2011 || La Sagra || OAM Obs. ||  || align=right | 1.00 km || 
|-id=110 bgcolor=#E9E9E9
| 495110 ||  || — || October 21, 2011 || Catalina || CSS ||  || align=right | 1.7 km || 
|-id=111 bgcolor=#fefefe
| 495111 ||  || — || October 25, 2011 || Haleakala || Pan-STARRS ||  || align=right data-sort-value="0.78" | 780 m || 
|-id=112 bgcolor=#fefefe
| 495112 ||  || — || September 13, 2007 || Mount Lemmon || Mount Lemmon Survey || NYS || align=right data-sort-value="0.61" | 610 m || 
|-id=113 bgcolor=#fefefe
| 495113 ||  || — || October 26, 2011 || Haleakala || Pan-STARRS ||  || align=right data-sort-value="0.55" | 550 m || 
|-id=114 bgcolor=#fefefe
| 495114 ||  || — || October 26, 2011 || Haleakala || Pan-STARRS ||  || align=right data-sort-value="0.82" | 820 m || 
|-id=115 bgcolor=#fefefe
| 495115 ||  || — || October 9, 2004 || Kitt Peak || Spacewatch ||  || align=right data-sort-value="0.56" | 560 m || 
|-id=116 bgcolor=#fefefe
| 495116 ||  || — || October 20, 2011 || Mount Lemmon || Mount Lemmon Survey ||  || align=right data-sort-value="0.62" | 620 m || 
|-id=117 bgcolor=#E9E9E9
| 495117 ||  || — || November 13, 2007 || Kitt Peak || Spacewatch ||  || align=right data-sort-value="0.86" | 860 m || 
|-id=118 bgcolor=#fefefe
| 495118 ||  || — || March 14, 2010 || Mount Lemmon || Mount Lemmon Survey ||  || align=right data-sort-value="0.58" | 580 m || 
|-id=119 bgcolor=#fefefe
| 495119 ||  || — || September 20, 2011 || Kitt Peak || Spacewatch ||  || align=right data-sort-value="0.76" | 760 m || 
|-id=120 bgcolor=#fefefe
| 495120 ||  || — || October 25, 2011 || Haleakala || Pan-STARRS ||  || align=right data-sort-value="0.94" | 940 m || 
|-id=121 bgcolor=#fefefe
| 495121 ||  || — || October 24, 2011 || Haleakala || Pan-STARRS ||  || align=right data-sort-value="0.59" | 590 m || 
|-id=122 bgcolor=#FA8072
| 495122 ||  || — || February 10, 2008 || Catalina || CSS || BAR || align=right | 1.4 km || 
|-id=123 bgcolor=#FA8072
| 495123 ||  || — || October 26, 2011 || Haleakala || Pan-STARRS ||  || align=right data-sort-value="0.58" | 580 m || 
|-id=124 bgcolor=#fefefe
| 495124 ||  || — || November 18, 2011 || Mount Lemmon || Mount Lemmon Survey ||  || align=right | 1.7 km || 
|-id=125 bgcolor=#fefefe
| 495125 ||  || — || November 15, 2011 || Mount Lemmon || Mount Lemmon Survey ||  || align=right data-sort-value="0.58" | 580 m || 
|-id=126 bgcolor=#d6d6d6
| 495126 ||  || — || October 26, 2011 || Haleakala || Pan-STARRS ||  || align=right | 2.2 km || 
|-id=127 bgcolor=#fefefe
| 495127 ||  || — || October 21, 2011 || Mount Lemmon || Mount Lemmon Survey ||  || align=right data-sort-value="0.71" | 710 m || 
|-id=128 bgcolor=#fefefe
| 495128 ||  || — || September 17, 2004 || Kitt Peak || Spacewatch ||  || align=right data-sort-value="0.55" | 550 m || 
|-id=129 bgcolor=#fefefe
| 495129 ||  || — || October 23, 2011 || Haleakala || Pan-STARRS ||  || align=right data-sort-value="0.96" | 960 m || 
|-id=130 bgcolor=#fefefe
| 495130 ||  || — || October 26, 2011 || Haleakala || Pan-STARRS ||  || align=right data-sort-value="0.66" | 660 m || 
|-id=131 bgcolor=#E9E9E9
| 495131 ||  || — || March 13, 2008 || Catalina || CSS ||  || align=right | 1.6 km || 
|-id=132 bgcolor=#E9E9E9
| 495132 ||  || — || December 27, 2011 || Kitt Peak || Spacewatch ||  || align=right | 1.4 km || 
|-id=133 bgcolor=#E9E9E9
| 495133 ||  || — || December 31, 2011 || Kitt Peak || Spacewatch || critical || align=right data-sort-value="0.94" | 940 m || 
|-id=134 bgcolor=#E9E9E9
| 495134 ||  || — || January 14, 2012 || Kitt Peak || Spacewatch ||  || align=right | 1.6 km || 
|-id=135 bgcolor=#E9E9E9
| 495135 ||  || — || January 18, 2012 || Kitt Peak || Spacewatch ||  || align=right | 1.6 km || 
|-id=136 bgcolor=#E9E9E9
| 495136 ||  || — || January 19, 2012 || Haleakala || Pan-STARRS ||  || align=right | 1.0 km || 
|-id=137 bgcolor=#E9E9E9
| 495137 ||  || — || December 26, 2011 || Kitt Peak || Spacewatch ||  || align=right | 1.7 km || 
|-id=138 bgcolor=#E9E9E9
| 495138 ||  || — || December 31, 2002 || Socorro || LINEAR ||  || align=right | 2.0 km || 
|-id=139 bgcolor=#E9E9E9
| 495139 ||  || — || December 24, 2011 || Catalina || CSS ||  || align=right | 2.0 km || 
|-id=140 bgcolor=#E9E9E9
| 495140 ||  || — || January 20, 2012 || Mount Lemmon || Mount Lemmon Survey || MAR || align=right | 1.0 km || 
|-id=141 bgcolor=#E9E9E9
| 495141 ||  || — || February 18, 2008 || Mount Lemmon || Mount Lemmon Survey ||  || align=right | 2.2 km || 
|-id=142 bgcolor=#E9E9E9
| 495142 ||  || — || January 20, 2012 || Kitt Peak || Spacewatch ||  || align=right | 1.6 km || 
|-id=143 bgcolor=#fefefe
| 495143 ||  || — || February 3, 2012 || Haleakala || Pan-STARRS ||  || align=right data-sort-value="0.73" | 730 m || 
|-id=144 bgcolor=#E9E9E9
| 495144 ||  || — || January 18, 2012 || Mount Lemmon || Mount Lemmon Survey ||  || align=right | 1.8 km || 
|-id=145 bgcolor=#E9E9E9
| 495145 ||  || — || January 19, 2012 || Haleakala || Pan-STARRS ||  || align=right | 1.5 km || 
|-id=146 bgcolor=#E9E9E9
| 495146 ||  || — || January 19, 2012 || Haleakala || Pan-STARRS || GEF || align=right | 2.6 km || 
|-id=147 bgcolor=#E9E9E9
| 495147 ||  || — || February 13, 2012 || Haleakala || Pan-STARRS || ADE || align=right | 1.2 km || 
|-id=148 bgcolor=#E9E9E9
| 495148 ||  || — || January 19, 2012 || Haleakala || Pan-STARRS || HNS || align=right | 1.6 km || 
|-id=149 bgcolor=#E9E9E9
| 495149 ||  || — || December 28, 2011 || Catalina || CSS ||  || align=right | 1.5 km || 
|-id=150 bgcolor=#E9E9E9
| 495150 ||  || — || January 21, 2012 || Haleakala || Pan-STARRS || MAR || align=right | 1.2 km || 
|-id=151 bgcolor=#E9E9E9
| 495151 ||  || — || August 15, 2009 || Catalina || CSS || MAR || align=right | 1.7 km || 
|-id=152 bgcolor=#E9E9E9
| 495152 ||  || — || January 19, 2012 || Haleakala || Pan-STARRS ||  || align=right | 1.2 km || 
|-id=153 bgcolor=#FA8072
| 495153 ||  || — || September 20, 2001 || Socorro || LINEAR ||  || align=right data-sort-value="0.45" | 450 m || 
|-id=154 bgcolor=#E9E9E9
| 495154 ||  || — || October 29, 2010 || Kitt Peak || Spacewatch || DOR || align=right | 1.9 km || 
|-id=155 bgcolor=#d6d6d6
| 495155 ||  || — || September 19, 2008 || Kitt Peak || Spacewatch || YAK || align=right | 1.9 km || 
|-id=156 bgcolor=#E9E9E9
| 495156 ||  || — || February 28, 2012 || Haleakala || Pan-STARRS || MRX || align=right | 2.0 km || 
|-id=157 bgcolor=#E9E9E9
| 495157 ||  || — || October 1, 2005 || Mount Lemmon || Mount Lemmon Survey || AGN || align=right | 1.7 km || 
|-id=158 bgcolor=#E9E9E9
| 495158 ||  || — || September 19, 2009 || Mount Lemmon || Mount Lemmon Survey ||  || align=right | 2.0 km || 
|-id=159 bgcolor=#E9E9E9
| 495159 ||  || — || October 27, 2005 || Kitt Peak || Spacewatch ||  || align=right | 2.0 km || 
|-id=160 bgcolor=#E9E9E9
| 495160 ||  || — || February 27, 2012 || Haleakala || Pan-STARRS || HNS || align=right | 1.8 km || 
|-id=161 bgcolor=#E9E9E9
| 495161 ||  || — || March 16, 2012 || Haleakala || Pan-STARRS ||  || align=right | 1.6 km || 
|-id=162 bgcolor=#FA8072
| 495162 ||  || — || March 13, 2012 || Kitt Peak || Spacewatch || H || align=right data-sort-value="0.56" | 560 m || 
|-id=163 bgcolor=#E9E9E9
| 495163 ||  || — || January 5, 2012 || Haleakala || Pan-STARRS ||  || align=right | 2.7 km || 
|-id=164 bgcolor=#E9E9E9
| 495164 ||  || — || November 25, 2005 || Mount Lemmon || Mount Lemmon Survey ||  || align=right | 2.2 km || 
|-id=165 bgcolor=#d6d6d6
| 495165 ||  || — || April 15, 2012 || Haleakala || Pan-STARRS ||  || align=right | 2.9 km || 
|-id=166 bgcolor=#d6d6d6
| 495166 ||  || — || April 26, 2007 || Mount Lemmon || Mount Lemmon Survey ||  || align=right | 2.6 km || 
|-id=167 bgcolor=#E9E9E9
| 495167 ||  || — || March 16, 2012 || Mount Lemmon || Mount Lemmon Survey ||  || align=right | 1.0 km || 
|-id=168 bgcolor=#FFC2E0
| 495168 ||  || — || April 28, 2012 || Mount Lemmon || Mount Lemmon Survey || AMOcritical || align=right data-sort-value="0.31" | 310 m || 
|-id=169 bgcolor=#d6d6d6
| 495169 ||  || — || April 25, 2007 || Kitt Peak || Spacewatch ||  || align=right | 2.1 km || 
|-id=170 bgcolor=#d6d6d6
| 495170 ||  || — || January 28, 2011 || Mount Lemmon || Mount Lemmon Survey ||  || align=right | 2.3 km || 
|-id=171 bgcolor=#fefefe
| 495171 ||  || — || December 28, 2003 || Socorro || LINEAR || H || align=right data-sort-value="0.75" | 750 m || 
|-id=172 bgcolor=#E9E9E9
| 495172 ||  || — || May 14, 2012 || Kitt Peak || Spacewatch ||  || align=right | 2.7 km || 
|-id=173 bgcolor=#d6d6d6
| 495173 ||  || — || May 21, 2012 || Haleakala || Pan-STARRS ||  || align=right | 3.1 km || 
|-id=174 bgcolor=#fefefe
| 495174 ||  || — || November 7, 2010 || Haleakala || Pan-STARRS || H || align=right data-sort-value="0.55" | 550 m || 
|-id=175 bgcolor=#d6d6d6
| 495175 ||  || — || June 14, 2012 || Mount Lemmon || Mount Lemmon Survey || TIR || align=right | 3.3 km || 
|-id=176 bgcolor=#fefefe
| 495176 ||  || — || June 17, 2012 || Mount Lemmon || Mount Lemmon Survey || H || align=right data-sort-value="0.91" | 910 m || 
|-id=177 bgcolor=#FA8072
| 495177 ||  || — || February 5, 2009 || Mount Lemmon || Mount Lemmon Survey || H || align=right data-sort-value="0.67" | 670 m || 
|-id=178 bgcolor=#d6d6d6
| 495178 ||  || — || September 20, 2007 || Catalina || CSS || EUP || align=right | 3.5 km || 
|-id=179 bgcolor=#d6d6d6
| 495179 ||  || — || June 16, 2012 || Haleakala || Pan-STARRS ||  || align=right | 3.0 km || 
|-id=180 bgcolor=#fefefe
| 495180 ||  || — || May 30, 2012 || Mount Lemmon || Mount Lemmon Survey || H || align=right data-sort-value="0.67" | 670 m || 
|-id=181 bgcolor=#E9E9E9
| 495181 Rogerwaters ||  ||  || August 15, 2012 || Tincana || M. Żołnowski, M. Kusiak ||  || align=right | 2.0 km || 
|-id=182 bgcolor=#d6d6d6
| 495182 ||  || — || August 22, 2012 || La Sagra || OAM Obs. ||  || align=right | 3.6 km || 
|-id=183 bgcolor=#d6d6d6
| 495183 ||  || — || April 4, 2011 || Kitt Peak || Spacewatch || EUP || align=right | 2.3 km || 
|-id=184 bgcolor=#d6d6d6
| 495184 ||  || — || October 9, 2007 || Kitt Peak || Spacewatch ||  || align=right | 2.6 km || 
|-id=185 bgcolor=#fefefe
| 495185 ||  || — || April 5, 2011 || Kitt Peak || Spacewatch ||  || align=right data-sort-value="0.71" | 710 m || 
|-id=186 bgcolor=#E9E9E9
| 495186 ||  || — || October 18, 2012 || Haleakala || Pan-STARRS ||  || align=right | 1.4 km || 
|-id=187 bgcolor=#FFC2E0
| 495187 ||  || — || November 13, 2012 || Socorro || LINEAR || APOPHA || align=right data-sort-value="0.23" | 230 m || 
|-id=188 bgcolor=#fefefe
| 495188 ||  || — || April 13, 2011 || Haleakala || Pan-STARRS || H || align=right data-sort-value="0.68" | 680 m || 
|-id=189 bgcolor=#C2E0FF
| 495189 ||  || — || September 28, 2013 || Cerro Tololo || CTIO-DES || twotinocritical || align=right | 211 km || 
|-id=190 bgcolor=#C2E0FF
| 495190 ||  || — || November 12, 2012 || Cerro Tololo || CTIO-DES || SDOcritical || align=right | 164 km || 
|-id=191 bgcolor=#fefefe
| 495191 ||  || — || December 5, 2012 || Mount Lemmon || Mount Lemmon Survey || H || align=right data-sort-value="0.91" | 910 m || 
|-id=192 bgcolor=#fefefe
| 495192 ||  || — || January 7, 2010 || Kitt Peak || Spacewatch ||  || align=right data-sort-value="0.62" | 620 m || 
|-id=193 bgcolor=#fefefe
| 495193 ||  || — || November 27, 2012 || Mount Lemmon || Mount Lemmon Survey ||  || align=right data-sort-value="0.91" | 910 m || 
|-id=194 bgcolor=#C2FFFF
| 495194 ||  || — || September 27, 2012 || Haleakala || Pan-STARRS || L4ERY || align=right | 7.3 km || 
|-id=195 bgcolor=#FA8072
| 495195 ||  || — || October 31, 2008 || Catalina || CSS ||  || align=right | 1.2 km || 
|-id=196 bgcolor=#fefefe
| 495196 ||  || — || February 7, 2002 || Kitt Peak || Spacewatch || NYS || align=right data-sort-value="0.52" | 520 m || 
|-id=197 bgcolor=#fefefe
| 495197 ||  || — || November 3, 2008 || Kitt Peak || Spacewatch ||  || align=right data-sort-value="0.59" | 590 m || 
|-id=198 bgcolor=#fefefe
| 495198 ||  || — || February 1, 2013 || Kitt Peak || Spacewatch || NYS || align=right data-sort-value="0.86" | 860 m || 
|-id=199 bgcolor=#fefefe
| 495199 ||  || — || March 16, 2002 || Socorro || LINEAR || NYS || align=right data-sort-value="0.82" | 820 m || 
|-id=200 bgcolor=#fefefe
| 495200 ||  || — || January 3, 2013 || Mount Lemmon || Mount Lemmon Survey ||  || align=right data-sort-value="0.65" | 650 m || 
|}

495201–495300 

|-bgcolor=#fefefe
| 495201 ||  || — || February 5, 2013 || Kitt Peak || Spacewatch ||  || align=right data-sort-value="0.78" | 780 m || 
|-id=202 bgcolor=#fefefe
| 495202 ||  || — || September 23, 2011 || Haleakala || Pan-STARRS ||  || align=right data-sort-value="0.94" | 940 m || 
|-id=203 bgcolor=#fefefe
| 495203 ||  || — || September 4, 2011 || Haleakala || Pan-STARRS ||  || align=right data-sort-value="0.80" | 800 m || 
|-id=204 bgcolor=#fefefe
| 495204 ||  || — || February 8, 2013 || Haleakala || Pan-STARRS ||  || align=right data-sort-value="0.72" | 720 m || 
|-id=205 bgcolor=#fefefe
| 495205 ||  || — || October 18, 2011 || Mount Lemmon || Mount Lemmon Survey ||  || align=right data-sort-value="0.75" | 750 m || 
|-id=206 bgcolor=#fefefe
| 495206 ||  || — || February 12, 2013 || Haleakala || Pan-STARRS || H || align=right data-sort-value="0.72" | 720 m || 
|-id=207 bgcolor=#fefefe
| 495207 ||  || — || February 5, 2013 || Kitt Peak || Spacewatch ||  || align=right data-sort-value="0.73" | 730 m || 
|-id=208 bgcolor=#fefefe
| 495208 ||  || — || January 3, 2013 || Haleakala || Pan-STARRS ||  || align=right data-sort-value="0.66" | 660 m || 
|-id=209 bgcolor=#fefefe
| 495209 ||  || — || January 9, 2013 || Mount Lemmon || Mount Lemmon Survey ||  || align=right data-sort-value="0.87" | 870 m || 
|-id=210 bgcolor=#fefefe
| 495210 ||  || — || February 5, 2013 || Kitt Peak || Spacewatch ||  || align=right data-sort-value="0.73" | 730 m || 
|-id=211 bgcolor=#fefefe
| 495211 ||  || — || March 2, 2006 || Mount Lemmon || Mount Lemmon Survey ||  || align=right data-sort-value="0.56" | 560 m || 
|-id=212 bgcolor=#fefefe
| 495212 ||  || — || May 19, 2010 || XuYi || PMO NEO ||  || align=right data-sort-value="0.83" | 830 m || 
|-id=213 bgcolor=#fefefe
| 495213 ||  || — || September 24, 2011 || Mount Lemmon || Mount Lemmon Survey ||  || align=right | 1.2 km || 
|-id=214 bgcolor=#fefefe
| 495214 ||  || — || February 11, 2013 || Catalina || CSS ||  || align=right data-sort-value="0.79" | 790 m || 
|-id=215 bgcolor=#fefefe
| 495215 ||  || — || April 2, 2006 || Kitt Peak || Spacewatch ||  || align=right data-sort-value="0.59" | 590 m || 
|-id=216 bgcolor=#fefefe
| 495216 ||  || — || September 9, 2007 || Mount Lemmon || Mount Lemmon Survey ||  || align=right data-sort-value="0.73" | 730 m || 
|-id=217 bgcolor=#fefefe
| 495217 ||  || — || October 20, 2011 || Mount Lemmon || Mount Lemmon Survey ||  || align=right data-sort-value="0.71" | 710 m || 
|-id=218 bgcolor=#fefefe
| 495218 ||  || — || March 2, 2006 || Kitt Peak || Spacewatch ||  || align=right data-sort-value="0.67" | 670 m || 
|-id=219 bgcolor=#fefefe
| 495219 ||  || — || March 11, 2013 || Mount Lemmon || Mount Lemmon Survey ||  || align=right data-sort-value="0.85" | 850 m || 
|-id=220 bgcolor=#fefefe
| 495220 ||  || — || September 23, 2011 || Haleakala || Pan-STARRS ||  || align=right data-sort-value="0.74" | 740 m || 
|-id=221 bgcolor=#fefefe
| 495221 ||  || — || March 24, 2006 || Kitt Peak || Spacewatch ||  || align=right data-sort-value="0.71" | 710 m || 
|-id=222 bgcolor=#FFC2E0
| 495222 ||  || — || April 7, 2013 || Haleakala || Pan-STARRS || AMO || align=right data-sort-value="0.25" | 250 m || 
|-id=223 bgcolor=#fefefe
| 495223 ||  || — || March 11, 2013 || Mount Lemmon || Mount Lemmon Survey || MAS || align=right data-sort-value="0.73" | 730 m || 
|-id=224 bgcolor=#E9E9E9
| 495224 ||  || — || April 10, 2013 || Mount Lemmon || Mount Lemmon Survey ||  || align=right | 1.5 km || 
|-id=225 bgcolor=#E9E9E9
| 495225 ||  || — || March 19, 2013 || Haleakala || Pan-STARRS ||  || align=right data-sort-value="0.83" | 830 m || 
|-id=226 bgcolor=#fefefe
| 495226 ||  || — || November 7, 2007 || Kitt Peak || Spacewatch ||  || align=right | 1.0 km || 
|-id=227 bgcolor=#E9E9E9
| 495227 ||  || — || May 14, 2005 || Mount Lemmon || Mount Lemmon Survey ||  || align=right data-sort-value="0.94" | 940 m || 
|-id=228 bgcolor=#fefefe
| 495228 ||  || — || March 24, 2009 || Mount Lemmon || Mount Lemmon Survey ||  || align=right data-sort-value="0.87" | 870 m || 
|-id=229 bgcolor=#fefefe
| 495229 ||  || — || August 2, 2010 || La Sagra || OAM Obs. ||  || align=right data-sort-value="0.90" | 900 m || 
|-id=230 bgcolor=#E9E9E9
| 495230 ||  || — || April 13, 2013 || Haleakala || Pan-STARRS ||  || align=right data-sort-value="0.77" | 770 m || 
|-id=231 bgcolor=#fefefe
| 495231 ||  || — || March 24, 2013 || Mount Lemmon || Mount Lemmon Survey ||  || align=right data-sort-value="0.81" | 810 m || 
|-id=232 bgcolor=#fefefe
| 495232 ||  || — || March 14, 2013 || Kitt Peak || Spacewatch ||  || align=right data-sort-value="0.74" | 740 m || 
|-id=233 bgcolor=#fefefe
| 495233 ||  || — || October 24, 2011 || Haleakala || Pan-STARRS ||  || align=right data-sort-value="0.75" | 750 m || 
|-id=234 bgcolor=#fefefe
| 495234 ||  || — || September 10, 2010 || La Sagra || OAM Obs. || NYS || align=right data-sort-value="0.68" | 680 m || 
|-id=235 bgcolor=#d6d6d6
| 495235 ||  || — || January 21, 2013 || Haleakala || Pan-STARRS ||  || align=right | 3.0 km || 
|-id=236 bgcolor=#fefefe
| 495236 ||  || — || March 22, 2009 || Mount Lemmon || Mount Lemmon Survey || NYS || align=right data-sort-value="0.49" | 490 m || 
|-id=237 bgcolor=#E9E9E9
| 495237 ||  || — || August 28, 2005 || Socorro || LINEAR ||  || align=right | 1.2 km || 
|-id=238 bgcolor=#E9E9E9
| 495238 ||  || — || April 10, 2013 || Mount Lemmon || Mount Lemmon Survey ||  || align=right | 1.3 km || 
|-id=239 bgcolor=#fefefe
| 495239 ||  || — || October 9, 2010 || Mount Lemmon || Mount Lemmon Survey ||  || align=right data-sort-value="0.63" | 630 m || 
|-id=240 bgcolor=#E9E9E9
| 495240 ||  || — || May 15, 2013 || Haleakala || Pan-STARRS ||  || align=right | 1.3 km || 
|-id=241 bgcolor=#E9E9E9
| 495241 ||  || — || May 7, 2013 || Catalina || CSS || BAR || align=right | 1.2 km || 
|-id=242 bgcolor=#E9E9E9
| 495242 ||  || — || January 19, 2012 || Haleakala || Pan-STARRS ||  || align=right data-sort-value="0.88" | 880 m || 
|-id=243 bgcolor=#E9E9E9
| 495243 ||  || — || April 21, 2013 || Mount Lemmon || Mount Lemmon Survey ||  || align=right data-sort-value="0.86" | 860 m || 
|-id=244 bgcolor=#E9E9E9
| 495244 ||  || — || April 15, 2013 || Haleakala || Pan-STARRS ||  || align=right data-sort-value="0.94" | 940 m || 
|-id=245 bgcolor=#E9E9E9
| 495245 ||  || — || May 30, 2013 || Kitt Peak || Spacewatch ||  || align=right | 1.4 km || 
|-id=246 bgcolor=#E9E9E9
| 495246 ||  || — || May 16, 2013 || Kitt Peak || Spacewatch || HNS || align=right | 2.2 km || 
|-id=247 bgcolor=#E9E9E9
| 495247 ||  || — || September 30, 2005 || Mount Lemmon || Mount Lemmon Survey ||  || align=right | 1.8 km || 
|-id=248 bgcolor=#E9E9E9
| 495248 ||  || — || June 6, 2013 || Mount Lemmon || Mount Lemmon Survey || BAR || align=right | 2.2 km || 
|-id=249 bgcolor=#E9E9E9
| 495249 ||  || — || December 28, 2011 || Kitt Peak || Spacewatch ||  || align=right data-sort-value="0.87" | 870 m || 
|-id=250 bgcolor=#E9E9E9
| 495250 ||  || — || April 26, 2009 || Mount Lemmon || Mount Lemmon Survey ||  || align=right | 1.1 km || 
|-id=251 bgcolor=#E9E9E9
| 495251 ||  || — || December 8, 2010 || Mount Lemmon || Mount Lemmon Survey ||  || align=right | 1.3 km || 
|-id=252 bgcolor=#d6d6d6
| 495252 ||  || — || July 12, 2013 || Haleakala || Pan-STARRS ||  || align=right | 3.4 km || 
|-id=253 bgcolor=#fefefe
| 495253 Hanszimmer ||  ||  || July 30, 2013 || Tincana || M. Kusiak, M. Żołnowski ||  || align=right data-sort-value="0.94" | 940 m || 
|-id=254 bgcolor=#E9E9E9
| 495254 ||  || — || August 18, 2009 || Kitt Peak || Spacewatch ||  || align=right | 1.5 km || 
|-id=255 bgcolor=#E9E9E9
| 495255 ||  || — || June 5, 2013 || Mount Lemmon || Mount Lemmon Survey ||  || align=right | 1.6 km || 
|-id=256 bgcolor=#E9E9E9
| 495256 ||  || — || February 27, 2012 || Haleakala || Pan-STARRS ||  || align=right | 1.6 km || 
|-id=257 bgcolor=#d6d6d6
| 495257 ||  || — || August 8, 2013 || Kitt Peak || Spacewatch ||  || align=right | 2.8 km || 
|-id=258 bgcolor=#d6d6d6
| 495258 ||  || — || March 31, 2011 || Haleakala || Pan-STARRS ||  || align=right | 2.4 km || 
|-id=259 bgcolor=#d6d6d6
| 495259 ||  || — || May 16, 2012 || Haleakala || Pan-STARRS ||  || align=right | 3.0 km || 
|-id=260 bgcolor=#d6d6d6
| 495260 ||  || — || September 20, 2003 || Anderson Mesa || LONEOS ||  || align=right | 2.9 km || 
|-id=261 bgcolor=#E9E9E9
| 495261 ||  || — || September 11, 2004 || Kitt Peak || Spacewatch ||  || align=right | 1.8 km || 
|-id=262 bgcolor=#d6d6d6
| 495262 ||  || — || April 15, 2012 || Haleakala || Pan-STARRS ||  || align=right | 2.1 km || 
|-id=263 bgcolor=#d6d6d6
| 495263 ||  || — || April 3, 2011 || Haleakala || Pan-STARRS ||  || align=right | 3.2 km || 
|-id=264 bgcolor=#d6d6d6
| 495264 ||  || — || July 15, 2013 || Haleakala || Pan-STARRS ||  || align=right | 3.0 km || 
|-id=265 bgcolor=#E9E9E9
| 495265 ||  || — || March 15, 2012 || Kitt Peak || Spacewatch ||  || align=right | 1.9 km || 
|-id=266 bgcolor=#E9E9E9
| 495266 ||  || — || August 21, 2004 || Kitt Peak || Spacewatch ||  || align=right | 1.5 km || 
|-id=267 bgcolor=#d6d6d6
| 495267 ||  || — || August 27, 2013 || Haleakala || Pan-STARRS ||  || align=right | 2.9 km || 
|-id=268 bgcolor=#E9E9E9
| 495268 ||  || — || February 28, 2012 || Haleakala || Pan-STARRS || EUN || align=right | 1.4 km || 
|-id=269 bgcolor=#d6d6d6
| 495269 ||  || — || March 2, 2011 || Mount Lemmon || Mount Lemmon Survey ||  || align=right | 2.3 km || 
|-id=270 bgcolor=#d6d6d6
| 495270 ||  || — || August 30, 2013 || Haleakala || Pan-STARRS ||  || align=right | 2.8 km || 
|-id=271 bgcolor=#E9E9E9
| 495271 ||  || — || July 30, 2013 || Kitt Peak || Spacewatch ||  || align=right | 1.5 km || 
|-id=272 bgcolor=#E9E9E9
| 495272 ||  || — || July 30, 2013 || Kitt Peak || Spacewatch ||  || align=right | 1.8 km || 
|-id=273 bgcolor=#E9E9E9
| 495273 ||  || — || March 9, 2007 || Mount Lemmon || Mount Lemmon Survey ||  || align=right | 1.7 km || 
|-id=274 bgcolor=#E9E9E9
| 495274 ||  || — || September 21, 2009 || Mount Lemmon || Mount Lemmon Survey ||  || align=right | 1.5 km || 
|-id=275 bgcolor=#d6d6d6
| 495275 ||  || — || August 15, 2013 || Haleakala || Pan-STARRS ||  || align=right | 2.8 km || 
|-id=276 bgcolor=#d6d6d6
| 495276 ||  || — || July 29, 2008 || Mount Lemmon || Mount Lemmon Survey ||  || align=right | 1.8 km || 
|-id=277 bgcolor=#d6d6d6
| 495277 ||  || — || September 14, 2007 || Catalina || CSS ||  || align=right | 4.4 km || 
|-id=278 bgcolor=#FFC2E0
| 495278 ||  || — || August 25, 2004 || Kitt Peak || Spacewatch || AMOcritical || align=right data-sort-value="0.74" | 740 m || 
|-id=279 bgcolor=#d6d6d6
| 495279 ||  || — || May 2, 2006 || Mount Lemmon || Mount Lemmon Survey || EOS || align=right | 2.5 km || 
|-id=280 bgcolor=#d6d6d6
| 495280 ||  || — || November 26, 2008 || La Sagra || OAM Obs. || URS || align=right | 4.3 km || 
|-id=281 bgcolor=#E9E9E9
| 495281 ||  || — || February 18, 2010 || WISE || WISE ||  || align=right | 2.5 km || 
|-id=282 bgcolor=#d6d6d6
| 495282 ||  || — || September 13, 2007 || Mount Lemmon || Mount Lemmon Survey || THM || align=right | 2.6 km || 
|-id=283 bgcolor=#d6d6d6
| 495283 ||  || — || September 1, 2013 || Mount Lemmon || Mount Lemmon Survey ||  || align=right | 2.4 km || 
|-id=284 bgcolor=#E9E9E9
| 495284 ||  || — || April 15, 2012 || Haleakala || Pan-STARRS ||  || align=right | 1.8 km || 
|-id=285 bgcolor=#d6d6d6
| 495285 ||  || — || September 5, 2013 || Kitt Peak || Spacewatch ||  || align=right | 2.8 km || 
|-id=286 bgcolor=#d6d6d6
| 495286 ||  || — || September 5, 2013 || Kitt Peak || Spacewatch || TIR || align=right | 3.3 km || 
|-id=287 bgcolor=#d6d6d6
| 495287 Harari ||  ||  || September 11, 2013 || Tincana || M. Żołnowski, M. Kusiak ||  || align=right | 4.0 km || 
|-id=288 bgcolor=#d6d6d6
| 495288 ||  || — || August 27, 2013 || Haleakala || Pan-STARRS ||  || align=right | 3.0 km || 
|-id=289 bgcolor=#d6d6d6
| 495289 ||  || — || March 2, 2011 || Kitt Peak || Spacewatch ||  || align=right | 2.6 km || 
|-id=290 bgcolor=#d6d6d6
| 495290 ||  || — || October 8, 1996 || Kitt Peak || Spacewatch ||  || align=right | 2.7 km || 
|-id=291 bgcolor=#E9E9E9
| 495291 ||  || — || September 13, 2013 || Mount Lemmon || Mount Lemmon Survey ||  || align=right | 2.2 km || 
|-id=292 bgcolor=#d6d6d6
| 495292 ||  || — || September 2, 2013 || Mount Lemmon || Mount Lemmon Survey ||  || align=right | 2.3 km || 
|-id=293 bgcolor=#d6d6d6
| 495293 ||  || — || April 5, 2011 || Mount Lemmon || Mount Lemmon Survey ||  || align=right | 2.3 km || 
|-id=294 bgcolor=#d6d6d6
| 495294 ||  || — || October 16, 2001 || Kitt Peak || Spacewatch || 7:4 || align=right | 3.1 km || 
|-id=295 bgcolor=#d6d6d6
| 495295 ||  || — || October 3, 2013 || Haleakala || Pan-STARRS ||  || align=right | 2.9 km || 
|-id=296 bgcolor=#d6d6d6
| 495296 ||  || — || August 8, 2013 || Kitt Peak || Spacewatch || VER || align=right | 2.8 km || 
|-id=297 bgcolor=#C2E0FF
| 495297 ||  || — || October 13, 2013 || Cerro Tololo || CTIO-DECam || res3:7critical || align=right | 199 km || 
|-id=298 bgcolor=#d6d6d6
| 495298 ||  || — || April 30, 2011 || Haleakala || Pan-STARRS ||  || align=right | 4.2 km || 
|-id=299 bgcolor=#d6d6d6
| 495299 ||  || — || November 1, 2013 || Catalina || CSS || TIR || align=right | 3.5 km || 
|-id=300 bgcolor=#d6d6d6
| 495300 ||  || — || May 13, 2010 || WISE || WISE || ARM || align=right | 5.3 km || 
|}

495301–495400 

|-bgcolor=#d6d6d6
| 495301 ||  || — || May 31, 2000 || Kitt Peak || Spacewatch || TIR || align=right | 3.8 km || 
|-id=302 bgcolor=#d6d6d6
| 495302 ||  || — || January 6, 2003 || Kitt Peak || Spacewatch || EUP || align=right | 5.9 km || 
|-id=303 bgcolor=#d6d6d6
| 495303 ||  || — || November 1, 2013 || Haleakala || Pan-STARRS ||  || align=right | 3.4 km || 
|-id=304 bgcolor=#fefefe
| 495304 ||  || — || April 21, 2012 || Haleakala || Pan-STARRS || H || align=right data-sort-value="0.70" | 700 m || 
|-id=305 bgcolor=#fefefe
| 495305 ||  || — || March 3, 2009 || Catalina || CSS || H || align=right data-sort-value="0.68" | 680 m || 
|-id=306 bgcolor=#fefefe
| 495306 ||  || — || May 3, 2009 || Mount Lemmon || Mount Lemmon Survey || H || align=right data-sort-value="0.69" | 690 m || 
|-id=307 bgcolor=#fefefe
| 495307 ||  || — || February 17, 2007 || Kitt Peak || Spacewatch || H || align=right data-sort-value="0.43" | 430 m || 
|-id=308 bgcolor=#fefefe
| 495308 ||  || — || January 7, 2014 || Catalina || CSS || H || align=right data-sort-value="0.63" | 630 m || 
|-id=309 bgcolor=#fefefe
| 495309 ||  || — || July 29, 2012 || Haleakala || Pan-STARRS || H || align=right data-sort-value="0.71" | 710 m || 
|-id=310 bgcolor=#fefefe
| 495310 ||  || — || May 21, 2012 || Mount Lemmon || Mount Lemmon Survey || H || align=right data-sort-value="0.73" | 730 m || 
|-id=311 bgcolor=#fefefe
| 495311 ||  || — || March 7, 2014 || Catalina || CSS || H || align=right data-sort-value="0.81" | 810 m || 
|-id=312 bgcolor=#fefefe
| 495312 ||  || — || September 13, 2007 || Catalina || CSS || H || align=right data-sort-value="0.85" | 850 m || 
|-id=313 bgcolor=#fefefe
| 495313 ||  || — || February 23, 2006 || Anderson Mesa || LONEOS || H || align=right data-sort-value="0.66" | 660 m || 
|-id=314 bgcolor=#fefefe
| 495314 ||  || — || February 24, 2014 || Haleakala || Pan-STARRS || H || align=right data-sort-value="0.71" | 710 m || 
|-id=315 bgcolor=#fefefe
| 495315 ||  || — || May 11, 2007 || Mount Lemmon || Mount Lemmon Survey || MAS || align=right data-sort-value="0.62" | 620 m || 
|-id=316 bgcolor=#FFC2E0
| 495316 ||  || — || September 21, 2011 || Haleakala || Pan-STARRS || AMO || align=right data-sort-value="0.25" | 250 m || 
|-id=317 bgcolor=#FA8072
| 495317 ||  || — || December 17, 2007 || Mount Lemmon || Mount Lemmon Survey || H || align=right data-sort-value="0.78" | 780 m || 
|-id=318 bgcolor=#E9E9E9
| 495318 ||  || — || October 18, 2011 || Kitt Peak || Spacewatch || HOF || align=right | 2.1 km || 
|-id=319 bgcolor=#E9E9E9
| 495319 ||  || — || October 1, 2011 || Kitt Peak || Spacewatch ||  || align=right | 1.9 km || 
|-id=320 bgcolor=#d6d6d6
| 495320 ||  || — || September 5, 2010 || La Sagra || OAM Obs. || EOS || align=right | 2.9 km || 
|-id=321 bgcolor=#d6d6d6
| 495321 ||  || — || October 31, 2010 || Mount Lemmon || Mount Lemmon Survey ||  || align=right | 2.4 km || 
|-id=322 bgcolor=#E9E9E9
| 495322 ||  || — || January 30, 2004 || Kitt Peak || Spacewatch ||  || align=right | 1.8 km || 
|-id=323 bgcolor=#FFC2E0
| 495323 ||  || — || May 8, 2014 || Haleakala || Pan-STARRS || APO || align=right data-sort-value="0.41" | 410 m || 
|-id=324 bgcolor=#fefefe
| 495324 ||  || — || November 7, 2008 || Mount Lemmon || Mount Lemmon Survey ||  || align=right data-sort-value="0.77" | 770 m || 
|-id=325 bgcolor=#fefefe
| 495325 ||  || — || November 6, 2012 || Mount Lemmon || Mount Lemmon Survey ||  || align=right data-sort-value="0.79" | 790 m || 
|-id=326 bgcolor=#d6d6d6
| 495326 ||  || — || September 27, 2011 || Mount Lemmon || Mount Lemmon Survey ||  || align=right | 2.5 km || 
|-id=327 bgcolor=#d6d6d6
| 495327 ||  || — || April 1, 2008 || Mount Lemmon || Mount Lemmon Survey ||  || align=right | 2.3 km || 
|-id=328 bgcolor=#E9E9E9
| 495328 ||  || — || June 9, 2005 || Kitt Peak || Spacewatch ||  || align=right | 2.4 km || 
|-id=329 bgcolor=#fefefe
| 495329 ||  || — || February 8, 2007 || Kitt Peak || Spacewatch ||  || align=right data-sort-value="0.58" | 580 m || 
|-id=330 bgcolor=#E9E9E9
| 495330 ||  || — || February 14, 2013 || Haleakala || Pan-STARRS ||  || align=right | 1.4 km || 
|-id=331 bgcolor=#FFC2E0
| 495331 ||  || — || October 21, 2011 || Mount Lemmon || Mount Lemmon Survey || AMO || align=right data-sort-value="0.51" | 510 m || 
|-id=332 bgcolor=#E9E9E9
| 495332 ||  || — || November 20, 2008 || Mount Lemmon || Mount Lemmon Survey ||  || align=right | 1.7 km || 
|-id=333 bgcolor=#fefefe
| 495333 ||  || — || December 22, 2008 || Kitt Peak || Spacewatch ||  || align=right data-sort-value="0.98" | 980 m || 
|-id=334 bgcolor=#fefefe
| 495334 ||  || — || December 20, 2006 || Mount Lemmon || Mount Lemmon Survey ||  || align=right data-sort-value="0.87" | 870 m || 
|-id=335 bgcolor=#fefefe
| 495335 ||  || — || November 10, 2004 || Kitt Peak || Spacewatch ||  || align=right data-sort-value="0.73" | 730 m || 
|-id=336 bgcolor=#fefefe
| 495336 ||  || — || October 25, 2011 || Haleakala || Pan-STARRS ||  || align=right | 1.1 km || 
|-id=337 bgcolor=#fefefe
| 495337 ||  || — || December 23, 2006 || Mount Lemmon || Mount Lemmon Survey ||  || align=right data-sort-value="0.69" | 690 m || 
|-id=338 bgcolor=#fefefe
| 495338 ||  || — || November 2, 2011 || Mount Lemmon || Mount Lemmon Survey ||  || align=right data-sort-value="0.81" | 810 m || 
|-id=339 bgcolor=#fefefe
| 495339 ||  || — || October 18, 2011 || Mount Lemmon || Mount Lemmon Survey ||  || align=right data-sort-value="0.62" | 620 m || 
|-id=340 bgcolor=#fefefe
| 495340 ||  || — || November 19, 2008 || Mount Lemmon || Mount Lemmon Survey ||  || align=right data-sort-value="0.55" | 550 m || 
|-id=341 bgcolor=#d6d6d6
| 495341 ||  || — || February 10, 2007 || Mount Lemmon || Mount Lemmon Survey ||  || align=right | 3.1 km || 
|-id=342 bgcolor=#E9E9E9
| 495342 ||  || — || December 31, 2007 || Anderson Mesa || LONEOS ||  || align=right | 2.2 km || 
|-id=343 bgcolor=#fefefe
| 495343 ||  || — || November 16, 2011 || Mount Lemmon || Mount Lemmon Survey ||  || align=right data-sort-value="0.71" | 710 m || 
|-id=344 bgcolor=#d6d6d6
| 495344 ||  || — || April 20, 2013 || Mount Lemmon || Mount Lemmon Survey || URS || align=right | 3.2 km || 
|-id=345 bgcolor=#fefefe
| 495345 ||  || — || September 17, 2004 || Kitt Peak || Spacewatch ||  || align=right data-sort-value="0.56" | 560 m || 
|-id=346 bgcolor=#fefefe
| 495346 ||  || — || January 7, 2006 || Mount Lemmon || Mount Lemmon Survey ||  || align=right data-sort-value="0.64" | 640 m || 
|-id=347 bgcolor=#fefefe
| 495347 ||  || — || September 23, 2011 || Haleakala || Pan-STARRS ||  || align=right data-sort-value="0.70" | 700 m || 
|-id=348 bgcolor=#fefefe
| 495348 ||  || — || May 26, 2007 || Mount Lemmon || Mount Lemmon Survey ||  || align=right data-sort-value="0.50" | 500 m || 
|-id=349 bgcolor=#E9E9E9
| 495349 ||  || — || September 18, 2006 || Catalina || CSS ||  || align=right data-sort-value="0.86" | 860 m || 
|-id=350 bgcolor=#E9E9E9
| 495350 ||  || — || October 1, 2010 || Mount Lemmon || Mount Lemmon Survey || AGN || align=right | 1.6 km || 
|-id=351 bgcolor=#fefefe
| 495351 ||  || — || October 18, 2011 || Kitt Peak || Spacewatch ||  || align=right data-sort-value="0.62" | 620 m || 
|-id=352 bgcolor=#E9E9E9
| 495352 ||  || — || March 12, 2013 || Kitt Peak || Spacewatch ||  || align=right | 1.3 km || 
|-id=353 bgcolor=#fefefe
| 495353 ||  || — || June 27, 2014 || Haleakala || Pan-STARRS ||  || align=right data-sort-value="0.64" | 640 m || 
|-id=354 bgcolor=#fefefe
| 495354 ||  || — || February 9, 2010 || Kitt Peak || Spacewatch ||  || align=right data-sort-value="0.56" | 560 m || 
|-id=355 bgcolor=#fefefe
| 495355 ||  || — || October 26, 2011 || Haleakala || Pan-STARRS ||  || align=right data-sort-value="0.50" | 500 m || 
|-id=356 bgcolor=#E9E9E9
| 495356 ||  || — || February 7, 2008 || Mount Lemmon || Mount Lemmon Survey || NEM || align=right | 1.8 km || 
|-id=357 bgcolor=#d6d6d6
| 495357 ||  || — || January 4, 2012 || Mount Lemmon || Mount Lemmon Survey ||  || align=right | 2.8 km || 
|-id=358 bgcolor=#E9E9E9
| 495358 ||  || — || May 15, 2009 || Kitt Peak || Spacewatch ||  || align=right | 1.3 km || 
|-id=359 bgcolor=#d6d6d6
| 495359 ||  || — || February 17, 2007 || Mount Lemmon || Mount Lemmon Survey ||  || align=right | 2.1 km || 
|-id=360 bgcolor=#fefefe
| 495360 ||  || — || February 14, 2013 || Haleakala || Pan-STARRS ||  || align=right data-sort-value="0.77" | 770 m || 
|-id=361 bgcolor=#fefefe
| 495361 ||  || — || July 7, 2014 || Haleakala || Pan-STARRS ||  || align=right data-sort-value="0.66" | 660 m || 
|-id=362 bgcolor=#fefefe
| 495362 ||  || — || June 2, 2014 || Haleakala || Pan-STARRS ||  || align=right data-sort-value="0.52" | 520 m || 
|-id=363 bgcolor=#d6d6d6
| 495363 ||  || — || September 27, 2009 || Kitt Peak || Spacewatch ||  || align=right | 2.4 km || 
|-id=364 bgcolor=#fefefe
| 495364 ||  || — || October 23, 2011 || Haleakala || Pan-STARRS ||  || align=right data-sort-value="0.72" | 720 m || 
|-id=365 bgcolor=#fefefe
| 495365 ||  || — || December 30, 2007 || Mount Lemmon || Mount Lemmon Survey ||  || align=right data-sort-value="0.90" | 900 m || 
|-id=366 bgcolor=#fefefe
| 495366 ||  || — || November 26, 2011 || Kitt Peak || Spacewatch ||  || align=right data-sort-value="0.84" | 840 m || 
|-id=367 bgcolor=#fefefe
| 495367 ||  || — || July 30, 2010 || WISE || WISE ||  || align=right data-sort-value="0.54" | 540 m || 
|-id=368 bgcolor=#fefefe
| 495368 ||  || — || January 11, 2008 || Kitt Peak || Spacewatch || MAS || align=right data-sort-value="0.69" | 690 m || 
|-id=369 bgcolor=#d6d6d6
| 495369 ||  || — || May 7, 2014 || Haleakala || Pan-STARRS ||  || align=right | 3.2 km || 
|-id=370 bgcolor=#fefefe
| 495370 ||  || — || October 24, 2011 || Haleakala || Pan-STARRS ||  || align=right data-sort-value="0.69" | 690 m || 
|-id=371 bgcolor=#fefefe
| 495371 ||  || — || October 3, 1999 || Kitt Peak || Spacewatch || NYS || align=right data-sort-value="0.68" | 680 m || 
|-id=372 bgcolor=#E9E9E9
| 495372 ||  || — || March 15, 2008 || Kitt Peak || Spacewatch || WIT || align=right | 1.6 km || 
|-id=373 bgcolor=#E9E9E9
| 495373 ||  || — || November 11, 2007 || Mount Lemmon || Mount Lemmon Survey ||  || align=right | 1.7 km || 
|-id=374 bgcolor=#d6d6d6
| 495374 ||  || — || May 12, 2013 || Haleakala || Pan-STARRS ||  || align=right | 3.2 km || 
|-id=375 bgcolor=#fefefe
| 495375 ||  || — || April 18, 2007 || Kitt Peak || Spacewatch ||  || align=right data-sort-value="0.58" | 580 m || 
|-id=376 bgcolor=#E9E9E9
| 495376 ||  || — || February 13, 2012 || Haleakala || Pan-STARRS ||  || align=right | 1.7 km || 
|-id=377 bgcolor=#E9E9E9
| 495377 ||  || — || March 19, 2013 || Haleakala || Pan-STARRS || AGN || align=right | 1.9 km || 
|-id=378 bgcolor=#fefefe
| 495378 ||  || — || September 12, 2007 || Catalina || CSS ||  || align=right data-sort-value="0.58" | 580 m || 
|-id=379 bgcolor=#fefefe
| 495379 ||  || — || October 29, 2008 || Kitt Peak || Spacewatch ||  || align=right data-sort-value="0.50" | 500 m || 
|-id=380 bgcolor=#d6d6d6
| 495380 ||  || — || April 26, 2007 || Mount Lemmon || Mount Lemmon Survey ||  || align=right | 3.3 km || 
|-id=381 bgcolor=#fefefe
| 495381 ||  || — || July 25, 2014 || Haleakala || Pan-STARRS ||  || align=right data-sort-value="0.68" | 680 m || 
|-id=382 bgcolor=#fefefe
| 495382 ||  || — || August 3, 2014 || Haleakala || Pan-STARRS ||  || align=right data-sort-value="0.89" | 890 m || 
|-id=383 bgcolor=#fefefe
| 495383 ||  || — || July 30, 2014 || Kitt Peak || Spacewatch ||  || align=right data-sort-value="0.59" | 590 m || 
|-id=384 bgcolor=#fefefe
| 495384 ||  || — || March 7, 2013 || Mount Lemmon || Mount Lemmon Survey ||  || align=right data-sort-value="0.60" | 600 m || 
|-id=385 bgcolor=#fefefe
| 495385 ||  || — || January 30, 2009 || Mount Lemmon || Mount Lemmon Survey ||  || align=right data-sort-value="0.86" | 860 m || 
|-id=386 bgcolor=#fefefe
| 495386 ||  || — || October 24, 2011 || Haleakala || Pan-STARRS ||  || align=right data-sort-value="0.67" | 670 m || 
|-id=387 bgcolor=#fefefe
| 495387 ||  || — || November 5, 1999 || Kitt Peak || Spacewatch ||  || align=right data-sort-value="0.83" | 830 m || 
|-id=388 bgcolor=#fefefe
| 495388 ||  || — || September 10, 2007 || Mount Lemmon || Mount Lemmon Survey ||  || align=right data-sort-value="0.67" | 670 m || 
|-id=389 bgcolor=#d6d6d6
| 495389 ||  || — || May 12, 2012 || Mount Lemmon || Mount Lemmon Survey ||  || align=right | 2.4 km || 
|-id=390 bgcolor=#fefefe
| 495390 ||  || — || February 17, 2013 || Mount Lemmon || Mount Lemmon Survey ||  || align=right data-sort-value="0.91" | 910 m || 
|-id=391 bgcolor=#fefefe
| 495391 ||  || — || April 10, 2013 || Haleakala || Pan-STARRS ||  || align=right data-sort-value="0.90" | 900 m || 
|-id=392 bgcolor=#E9E9E9
| 495392 ||  || — || February 16, 2012 || Haleakala || Pan-STARRS ||  || align=right | 1.6 km || 
|-id=393 bgcolor=#fefefe
| 495393 ||  || — || August 1, 2010 || WISE || WISE ||  || align=right | 1.4 km || 
|-id=394 bgcolor=#E9E9E9
| 495394 ||  || — || November 24, 2011 || Haleakala || Pan-STARRS ||  || align=right | 1.6 km || 
|-id=395 bgcolor=#E9E9E9
| 495395 ||  || — || March 13, 2012 || Mount Lemmon || Mount Lemmon Survey ||  || align=right | 1.6 km || 
|-id=396 bgcolor=#fefefe
| 495396 ||  || — || July 25, 2014 || Haleakala || Pan-STARRS ||  || align=right data-sort-value="0.80" | 800 m || 
|-id=397 bgcolor=#E9E9E9
| 495397 ||  || — || February 8, 2008 || Kitt Peak || Spacewatch ||  || align=right | 1.6 km || 
|-id=398 bgcolor=#FA8072
| 495398 ||  || — || August 22, 2007 || Anderson Mesa || LONEOS ||  || align=right data-sort-value="0.51" | 510 m || 
|-id=399 bgcolor=#fefefe
| 495399 ||  || — || June 2, 2014 || Mount Lemmon || Mount Lemmon Survey ||  || align=right data-sort-value="0.60" | 600 m || 
|-id=400 bgcolor=#E9E9E9
| 495400 ||  || — || January 12, 1994 || Kitt Peak || Spacewatch ||  || align=right | 1.6 km || 
|}

495401–495500 

|-bgcolor=#fefefe
| 495401 ||  || — || March 4, 2005 || Mount Lemmon || Mount Lemmon Survey || LCI || align=right data-sort-value="0.87" | 870 m || 
|-id=402 bgcolor=#fefefe
| 495402 ||  || — || September 10, 2007 || Kitt Peak || Spacewatch ||  || align=right data-sort-value="0.58" | 580 m || 
|-id=403 bgcolor=#E9E9E9
| 495403 ||  || — || August 27, 2014 || Haleakala || Pan-STARRS ||  || align=right | 1.2 km || 
|-id=404 bgcolor=#fefefe
| 495404 ||  || — || August 23, 2007 || Kitt Peak || Spacewatch ||  || align=right data-sort-value="0.43" | 430 m || 
|-id=405 bgcolor=#E9E9E9
| 495405 ||  || — || March 2, 2008 || Mount Lemmon || Mount Lemmon Survey || MAR || align=right | 1.2 km || 
|-id=406 bgcolor=#fefefe
| 495406 ||  || — || September 14, 2007 || Mount Lemmon || Mount Lemmon Survey || NYS || align=right data-sort-value="0.66" | 660 m || 
|-id=407 bgcolor=#E9E9E9
| 495407 ||  || — || December 2, 2010 || Kitt Peak || Spacewatch ||  || align=right | 1.4 km || 
|-id=408 bgcolor=#d6d6d6
| 495408 ||  || — || November 26, 2009 || Mount Lemmon || Mount Lemmon Survey || EOS || align=right | 3.3 km || 
|-id=409 bgcolor=#E9E9E9
| 495409 ||  || — || March 30, 2008 || Kitt Peak || Spacewatch ||  || align=right | 1.5 km || 
|-id=410 bgcolor=#fefefe
| 495410 ||  || — || July 30, 2014 || Kitt Peak || Spacewatch || SVE || align=right | 1.0 km || 
|-id=411 bgcolor=#fefefe
| 495411 ||  || — || January 30, 2012 || Mount Lemmon || Mount Lemmon Survey ||  || align=right | 1.1 km || 
|-id=412 bgcolor=#d6d6d6
| 495412 ||  || — || January 4, 2010 || Kitt Peak || Spacewatch ||  || align=right | 1.8 km || 
|-id=413 bgcolor=#fefefe
| 495413 ||  || — || October 4, 2007 || Kitt Peak || Spacewatch || NYS || align=right data-sort-value="0.66" | 660 m || 
|-id=414 bgcolor=#fefefe
| 495414 ||  || — || April 11, 2013 || Mount Lemmon || Mount Lemmon Survey || NYS || align=right data-sort-value="0.72" | 720 m || 
|-id=415 bgcolor=#E9E9E9
| 495415 ||  || — || September 18, 2006 || Kitt Peak || Spacewatch || EUN || align=right data-sort-value="0.96" | 960 m || 
|-id=416 bgcolor=#fefefe
| 495416 ||  || — || January 19, 2012 || Mount Lemmon || Mount Lemmon Survey || MAS || align=right data-sort-value="0.80" | 800 m || 
|-id=417 bgcolor=#FFC2E0
| 495417 ||  || — || April 30, 2001 || Kitt Peak || Spacewatch || AMOcritical || align=right data-sort-value="0.41" | 410 m || 
|-id=418 bgcolor=#fefefe
| 495418 ||  || — || September 12, 2007 || Catalina || CSS ||  || align=right data-sort-value="0.66" | 660 m || 
|-id=419 bgcolor=#fefefe
| 495419 ||  || — || January 25, 2012 || Haleakala || Pan-STARRS ||  || align=right | 1.2 km || 
|-id=420 bgcolor=#fefefe
| 495420 ||  || — || January 3, 2009 || Kitt Peak || Spacewatch ||  || align=right data-sort-value="0.82" | 820 m || 
|-id=421 bgcolor=#fefefe
| 495421 ||  || — || October 22, 2003 || Kitt Peak || Spacewatch ||  || align=right data-sort-value="0.71" | 710 m || 
|-id=422 bgcolor=#fefefe
| 495422 ||  || — || February 25, 2006 || Kitt Peak || Spacewatch ||  || align=right data-sort-value="0.75" | 750 m || 
|-id=423 bgcolor=#fefefe
| 495423 ||  || — || October 4, 1999 || Socorro || LINEAR ||  || align=right | 1.0 km || 
|-id=424 bgcolor=#fefefe
| 495424 ||  || — || March 31, 2010 || WISE || WISE ||  || align=right data-sort-value="0.96" | 960 m || 
|-id=425 bgcolor=#fefefe
| 495425 ||  || — || July 31, 2014 || Haleakala || Pan-STARRS ||  || align=right data-sort-value="0.66" | 660 m || 
|-id=426 bgcolor=#E9E9E9
| 495426 ||  || — || December 7, 2005 || Kitt Peak || Spacewatch || MRX || align=right | 1.8 km || 
|-id=427 bgcolor=#d6d6d6
| 495427 ||  || — || July 15, 2013 || Haleakala || Pan-STARRS || TEL || align=right | 2.3 km || 
|-id=428 bgcolor=#E9E9E9
| 495428 ||  || — || April 1, 2008 || Mount Lemmon || Mount Lemmon Survey || EUN || align=right | 1.8 km || 
|-id=429 bgcolor=#E9E9E9
| 495429 ||  || — || March 26, 2008 || Mount Lemmon || Mount Lemmon Survey ||  || align=right | 1.1 km || 
|-id=430 bgcolor=#d6d6d6
| 495430 ||  || — || March 18, 2010 || WISE || WISE ||  || align=right | 3.2 km || 
|-id=431 bgcolor=#E9E9E9
| 495431 ||  || — || January 12, 2010 || WISE || WISE ||  || align=right | 2.5 km || 
|-id=432 bgcolor=#E9E9E9
| 495432 ||  || — || March 5, 2008 || Mount Lemmon || Mount Lemmon Survey || WIT || align=right | 1.6 km || 
|-id=433 bgcolor=#d6d6d6
| 495433 ||  || — || September 20, 2014 || Haleakala || Pan-STARRS ||  || align=right | 2.5 km || 
|-id=434 bgcolor=#fefefe
| 495434 ||  || — || January 30, 2009 || Kitt Peak || Spacewatch ||  || align=right data-sort-value="0.95" | 950 m || 
|-id=435 bgcolor=#E9E9E9
| 495435 ||  || — || November 1, 2005 || Mount Lemmon || Mount Lemmon Survey ||  || align=right | 2.3 km || 
|-id=436 bgcolor=#fefefe
| 495436 ||  || — || April 10, 2013 || Haleakala || Pan-STARRS || MAS || align=right data-sort-value="0.78" | 780 m || 
|-id=437 bgcolor=#E9E9E9
| 495437 ||  || — || November 25, 2005 || Kitt Peak || Spacewatch || WIT || align=right | 2.0 km || 
|-id=438 bgcolor=#E9E9E9
| 495438 ||  || — || September 14, 2014 || Mount Lemmon || Mount Lemmon Survey ||  || align=right | 1.7 km || 
|-id=439 bgcolor=#fefefe
| 495439 ||  || — || September 12, 2010 || Mount Lemmon || Mount Lemmon Survey ||  || align=right data-sort-value="0.85" | 850 m || 
|-id=440 bgcolor=#E9E9E9
| 495440 ||  || — || December 28, 2011 || Kitt Peak || Spacewatch ||  || align=right | 2.2 km || 
|-id=441 bgcolor=#E9E9E9
| 495441 ||  || — || December 4, 2010 || Mount Lemmon || Mount Lemmon Survey || EUN || align=right | 2.0 km || 
|-id=442 bgcolor=#E9E9E9
| 495442 ||  || — || September 24, 2014 || Haleakala || Pan-STARRS ||  || align=right | 1.2 km || 
|-id=443 bgcolor=#E9E9E9
| 495443 ||  || — || September 27, 2014 || Mount Lemmon || Mount Lemmon Survey ||  || align=right | 1.4 km || 
|-id=444 bgcolor=#E9E9E9
| 495444 ||  || — || September 25, 2014 || Mount Lemmon || Mount Lemmon Survey || HNS || align=right | 1.7 km || 
|-id=445 bgcolor=#E9E9E9
| 495445 ||  || — || February 28, 2012 || Haleakala || Pan-STARRS || WIT || align=right | 2.0 km || 
|-id=446 bgcolor=#E9E9E9
| 495446 ||  || — || March 28, 2008 || Kitt Peak || Spacewatch ||  || align=right | 1.3 km || 
|-id=447 bgcolor=#fefefe
| 495447 ||  || — || June 21, 2010 || Mount Lemmon || Mount Lemmon Survey || NYS || align=right data-sort-value="0.69" | 690 m || 
|-id=448 bgcolor=#E9E9E9
| 495448 ||  || — || October 7, 2005 || Kitt Peak || Spacewatch || WIT || align=right | 2.1 km || 
|-id=449 bgcolor=#d6d6d6
| 495449 ||  || — || December 25, 2005 || Kitt Peak || Spacewatch || KOR || align=right | 2.3 km || 
|-id=450 bgcolor=#E9E9E9
| 495450 ||  || — || September 4, 1997 || Caussols || ODAS ||  || align=right | 1.7 km || 
|-id=451 bgcolor=#E9E9E9
| 495451 ||  || — || November 1, 2005 || Mount Lemmon || Mount Lemmon Survey ||  || align=right | 2.9 km || 
|-id=452 bgcolor=#d6d6d6
| 495452 ||  || — || April 1, 2012 || Mount Lemmon || Mount Lemmon Survey || EOS || align=right | 2.7 km || 
|-id=453 bgcolor=#fefefe
| 495453 ||  || — || December 30, 2007 || Kitt Peak || Spacewatch || NYS || align=right data-sort-value="0.72" | 720 m || 
|-id=454 bgcolor=#E9E9E9
| 495454 ||  || — || November 10, 2010 || Kitt Peak || Spacewatch ||  || align=right | 1.5 km || 
|-id=455 bgcolor=#E9E9E9
| 495455 ||  || — || November 6, 2010 || Mount Lemmon || Mount Lemmon Survey ||  || align=right | 1.0 km || 
|-id=456 bgcolor=#E9E9E9
| 495456 ||  || — || January 10, 2007 || Mount Lemmon || Mount Lemmon Survey ||  || align=right | 1.3 km || 
|-id=457 bgcolor=#E9E9E9
| 495457 ||  || — || March 14, 2012 || Mount Lemmon || Mount Lemmon Survey || HNS || align=right | 2.1 km || 
|-id=458 bgcolor=#E9E9E9
| 495458 ||  || — || September 30, 2005 || Mount Lemmon || Mount Lemmon Survey ||  || align=right | 2.5 km || 
|-id=459 bgcolor=#E9E9E9
| 495459 ||  || — || October 2, 2014 || Haleakala || Pan-STARRS || MAR || align=right | 1.7 km || 
|-id=460 bgcolor=#E9E9E9
| 495460 ||  || — || October 2, 2005 || Mount Lemmon || Mount Lemmon Survey || NEM || align=right | 2.0 km || 
|-id=461 bgcolor=#E9E9E9
| 495461 ||  || — || April 15, 2013 || Haleakala || Pan-STARRS || EUN || align=right | 1.7 km || 
|-id=462 bgcolor=#E9E9E9
| 495462 ||  || — || March 11, 2000 || Anderson Mesa || LONEOS ||  || align=right | 1.3 km || 
|-id=463 bgcolor=#E9E9E9
| 495463 ||  || — || November 10, 2010 || Mount Lemmon || Mount Lemmon Survey ||  || align=right | 1.2 km || 
|-id=464 bgcolor=#E9E9E9
| 495464 ||  || — || August 24, 2001 || Anderson Mesa || LONEOS ||  || align=right | 1.5 km || 
|-id=465 bgcolor=#E9E9E9
| 495465 ||  || — || November 11, 2010 || Kitt Peak || Spacewatch ||  || align=right data-sort-value="0.87" | 870 m || 
|-id=466 bgcolor=#E9E9E9
| 495466 ||  || — || November 20, 2001 || Socorro || LINEAR || WIT || align=right | 2.1 km || 
|-id=467 bgcolor=#E9E9E9
| 495467 ||  || — || October 1, 2005 || Kitt Peak || Spacewatch ||  || align=right | 1.8 km || 
|-id=468 bgcolor=#E9E9E9
| 495468 ||  || — || April 21, 2013 || Mount Lemmon || Mount Lemmon Survey ||  || align=right | 1.1 km || 
|-id=469 bgcolor=#E9E9E9
| 495469 ||  || — || October 25, 2005 || Kitt Peak || Spacewatch || AGN || align=right | 2.1 km || 
|-id=470 bgcolor=#fefefe
| 495470 ||  || — || November 3, 2007 || Mount Lemmon || Mount Lemmon Survey ||  || align=right data-sort-value="0.92" | 920 m || 
|-id=471 bgcolor=#E9E9E9
| 495471 ||  || — || November 6, 2005 || Mount Lemmon || Mount Lemmon Survey || AGN || align=right | 2.1 km || 
|-id=472 bgcolor=#E9E9E9
| 495472 ||  || — || April 4, 2008 || Mount Lemmon || Mount Lemmon Survey || GEF || align=right | 2.2 km || 
|-id=473 bgcolor=#d6d6d6
| 495473 ||  || — || April 1, 2011 || Mount Lemmon || Mount Lemmon Survey ||  || align=right | 2.5 km || 
|-id=474 bgcolor=#E9E9E9
| 495474 ||  || — || November 13, 2010 || Mount Lemmon || Mount Lemmon Survey ||  || align=right | 1.8 km || 
|-id=475 bgcolor=#E9E9E9
| 495475 ||  || — || July 28, 2014 || Haleakala || Pan-STARRS ||  || align=right | 1.0 km || 
|-id=476 bgcolor=#d6d6d6
| 495476 ||  || — || May 6, 2006 || Mount Lemmon || Mount Lemmon Survey || EOS || align=right | 3.2 km || 
|-id=477 bgcolor=#d6d6d6
| 495477 ||  || — || September 27, 2003 || Socorro || LINEAR || EOS || align=right | 3.6 km || 
|-id=478 bgcolor=#E9E9E9
| 495478 ||  || — || October 23, 2006 || Mount Lemmon || Mount Lemmon Survey ||  || align=right data-sort-value="0.87" | 870 m || 
|-id=479 bgcolor=#E9E9E9
| 495479 ||  || — || April 27, 2001 || Kitt Peak || Spacewatch ||  || align=right data-sort-value="0.98" | 980 m || 
|-id=480 bgcolor=#E9E9E9
| 495480 ||  || — || May 15, 2012 || Mount Lemmon || Mount Lemmon Survey ||  || align=right | 2.3 km || 
|-id=481 bgcolor=#E9E9E9
| 495481 ||  || — || October 25, 2005 || Mount Lemmon || Mount Lemmon Survey ||  || align=right | 2.0 km || 
|-id=482 bgcolor=#d6d6d6
| 495482 ||  || — || September 30, 2014 || Mount Lemmon || Mount Lemmon Survey || EOS || align=right | 2.4 km || 
|-id=483 bgcolor=#E9E9E9
| 495483 ||  || — || December 2, 2010 || Mount Lemmon || Mount Lemmon Survey || KON || align=right | 1.0 km || 
|-id=484 bgcolor=#d6d6d6
| 495484 ||  || — || October 9, 2008 || Mount Lemmon || Mount Lemmon Survey ||  || align=right | 2.6 km || 
|-id=485 bgcolor=#E9E9E9
| 495485 ||  || — || November 14, 2010 || Kitt Peak || Spacewatch ||  || align=right data-sort-value="0.92" | 920 m || 
|-id=486 bgcolor=#d6d6d6
| 495486 ||  || — || November 17, 2009 || Mount Lemmon || Mount Lemmon Survey || KOR || align=right | 1.9 km || 
|-id=487 bgcolor=#E9E9E9
| 495487 ||  || — || August 28, 1995 || Kitt Peak || Spacewatch ||  || align=right | 1.6 km || 
|-id=488 bgcolor=#d6d6d6
| 495488 ||  || — || October 15, 2014 || Kitt Peak || Spacewatch ||  || align=right | 2.6 km || 
|-id=489 bgcolor=#d6d6d6
| 495489 ||  || — || October 3, 2014 || Mount Lemmon || Mount Lemmon Survey || EOS || align=right | 2.5 km || 
|-id=490 bgcolor=#E9E9E9
| 495490 ||  || — || January 28, 2007 || Mount Lemmon || Mount Lemmon Survey ||  || align=right | 1.9 km || 
|-id=491 bgcolor=#fefefe
| 495491 ||  || — || November 2, 2007 || Mount Lemmon || Mount Lemmon Survey ||  || align=right data-sort-value="0.78" | 780 m || 
|-id=492 bgcolor=#E9E9E9
| 495492 ||  || — || September 24, 2009 || Mount Lemmon || Mount Lemmon Survey ||  || align=right | 2.5 km || 
|-id=493 bgcolor=#d6d6d6
| 495493 ||  || — || October 3, 2014 || Mount Lemmon || Mount Lemmon Survey ||  || align=right | 2.8 km || 
|-id=494 bgcolor=#E9E9E9
| 495494 ||  || — || May 3, 2008 || Mount Lemmon || Mount Lemmon Survey ||  || align=right | 1.8 km || 
|-id=495 bgcolor=#E9E9E9
| 495495 ||  || — || February 27, 2012 || Haleakala || Pan-STARRS ||  || align=right | 1.4 km || 
|-id=496 bgcolor=#d6d6d6
| 495496 ||  || — || October 23, 2009 || Mount Lemmon || Mount Lemmon Survey ||  || align=right | 2.4 km || 
|-id=497 bgcolor=#E9E9E9
| 495497 ||  || — || December 13, 2010 || Mount Lemmon || Mount Lemmon Survey ||  || align=right | 1.5 km || 
|-id=498 bgcolor=#fefefe
| 495498 ||  || — || December 31, 2011 || Kitt Peak || Spacewatch ||  || align=right data-sort-value="0.99" | 990 m || 
|-id=499 bgcolor=#E9E9E9
| 495499 ||  || — || November 3, 2005 || Catalina || CSS ||  || align=right | 2.4 km || 
|-id=500 bgcolor=#E9E9E9
| 495500 ||  || — || September 21, 2009 || Mount Lemmon || Mount Lemmon Survey || AGN || align=right | 2.0 km || 
|}

495501–495600 

|-bgcolor=#E9E9E9
| 495501 ||  || — || October 27, 2005 || Kitt Peak || Spacewatch ||  || align=right | 1.9 km || 
|-id=502 bgcolor=#d6d6d6
| 495502 ||  || — || April 11, 2011 || Mount Lemmon || Mount Lemmon Survey || EOS || align=right | 2.5 km || 
|-id=503 bgcolor=#d6d6d6
| 495503 ||  || — || March 30, 2010 || WISE || WISE ||  || align=right | 3.3 km || 
|-id=504 bgcolor=#fefefe
| 495504 ||  || — || November 14, 2007 || Kitt Peak || Spacewatch ||  || align=right | 1.0 km || 
|-id=505 bgcolor=#E9E9E9
| 495505 ||  || — || November 11, 2010 || Mount Lemmon || Mount Lemmon Survey ||  || align=right | 1.5 km || 
|-id=506 bgcolor=#E9E9E9
| 495506 ||  || — || May 26, 2008 || Kitt Peak || Spacewatch ||  || align=right | 1.9 km || 
|-id=507 bgcolor=#fefefe
| 495507 ||  || — || December 17, 2007 || Kitt Peak || Spacewatch ||  || align=right data-sort-value="0.87" | 870 m || 
|-id=508 bgcolor=#E9E9E9
| 495508 ||  || — || October 28, 2014 || Haleakala || Pan-STARRS ||  || align=right | 1.8 km || 
|-id=509 bgcolor=#E9E9E9
| 495509 ||  || — || October 9, 2010 || Mount Lemmon || Mount Lemmon Survey ||  || align=right | 1.7 km || 
|-id=510 bgcolor=#E9E9E9
| 495510 ||  || — || September 30, 2005 || Mount Lemmon || Mount Lemmon Survey ||  || align=right | 2.5 km || 
|-id=511 bgcolor=#FFC2E0
| 495511 ||  || — || October 31, 2014 || Mount Lemmon || Mount Lemmon Survey || AMO || align=right data-sort-value="0.49" | 490 m || 
|-id=512 bgcolor=#d6d6d6
| 495512 ||  || — || October 8, 2008 || Kitt Peak || Spacewatch || EOS || align=right | 2.5 km || 
|-id=513 bgcolor=#E9E9E9
| 495513 ||  || — || July 11, 2005 || Mount Lemmon || Mount Lemmon Survey ||  || align=right | 1.5 km || 
|-id=514 bgcolor=#E9E9E9
| 495514 ||  || — || June 30, 2014 || Haleakala || Pan-STARRS ||  || align=right | 2.6 km || 
|-id=515 bgcolor=#E9E9E9
| 495515 ||  || — || July 30, 2014 || Kitt Peak || Spacewatch ||  || align=right | 1.5 km || 
|-id=516 bgcolor=#E9E9E9
| 495516 ||  || — || October 30, 2010 || Kitt Peak || Spacewatch ||  || align=right | 1.1 km || 
|-id=517 bgcolor=#E9E9E9
| 495517 ||  || — || October 21, 2014 || Catalina || CSS || MAR || align=right | 1.8 km || 
|-id=518 bgcolor=#E9E9E9
| 495518 ||  || — || December 25, 2010 || Mount Lemmon || Mount Lemmon Survey || EUN || align=right | 1.5 km || 
|-id=519 bgcolor=#E9E9E9
| 495519 ||  || — || November 29, 2005 || Kitt Peak || Spacewatch ||  || align=right | 2.2 km || 
|-id=520 bgcolor=#d6d6d6
| 495520 ||  || — || October 3, 2014 || Mount Lemmon || Mount Lemmon Survey ||  || align=right | 3.0 km || 
|-id=521 bgcolor=#E9E9E9
| 495521 ||  || — || November 10, 2010 || Mount Lemmon || Mount Lemmon Survey ||  || align=right | 1.8 km || 
|-id=522 bgcolor=#E9E9E9
| 495522 ||  || — || October 1, 2009 || Mount Lemmon || Mount Lemmon Survey ||  || align=right | 1.9 km || 
|-id=523 bgcolor=#d6d6d6
| 495523 ||  || — || December 18, 2009 || Mount Lemmon || Mount Lemmon Survey ||  || align=right | 3.5 km || 
|-id=524 bgcolor=#E9E9E9
| 495524 ||  || — || February 27, 2012 || Haleakala || Pan-STARRS ||  || align=right | 1.4 km || 
|-id=525 bgcolor=#E9E9E9
| 495525 ||  || — || January 23, 2011 || Mount Lemmon || Mount Lemmon Survey || HOF || align=right | 2.1 km || 
|-id=526 bgcolor=#E9E9E9
| 495526 ||  || — || January 29, 2011 || Mount Lemmon || Mount Lemmon Survey ||  || align=right | 1.9 km || 
|-id=527 bgcolor=#E9E9E9
| 495527 ||  || — || October 26, 2014 || Mount Lemmon || Mount Lemmon Survey ||  || align=right | 2.4 km || 
|-id=528 bgcolor=#d6d6d6
| 495528 ||  || — || May 15, 2012 || Mount Lemmon || Mount Lemmon Survey ||  || align=right | 2.5 km || 
|-id=529 bgcolor=#d6d6d6
| 495529 ||  || — || October 7, 2004 || Kitt Peak || Spacewatch ||  || align=right | 2.3 km || 
|-id=530 bgcolor=#E9E9E9
| 495530 ||  || — || April 15, 2012 || Haleakala || Pan-STARRS ||  || align=right | 2.1 km || 
|-id=531 bgcolor=#E9E9E9
| 495531 ||  || — || November 30, 2010 || Mount Lemmon || Mount Lemmon Survey ||  || align=right | 1.3 km || 
|-id=532 bgcolor=#E9E9E9
| 495532 ||  || — || October 16, 2009 || Mount Lemmon || Mount Lemmon Survey ||  || align=right | 1.9 km || 
|-id=533 bgcolor=#d6d6d6
| 495533 ||  || — || October 5, 2014 || Mount Lemmon || Mount Lemmon Survey || EOS || align=right | 2.7 km || 
|-id=534 bgcolor=#E9E9E9
| 495534 ||  || — || September 28, 2009 || Mount Lemmon || Mount Lemmon Survey || AGN || align=right | 2.2 km || 
|-id=535 bgcolor=#E9E9E9
| 495535 ||  || — || May 8, 2013 || Haleakala || Pan-STARRS ||  || align=right | 1.0 km || 
|-id=536 bgcolor=#E9E9E9
| 495536 ||  || — || December 1, 2010 || Mount Lemmon || Mount Lemmon Survey ||  || align=right data-sort-value="0.94" | 940 m || 
|-id=537 bgcolor=#d6d6d6
| 495537 ||  || — || August 15, 2013 || Haleakala || Pan-STARRS ||  || align=right | 2.4 km || 
|-id=538 bgcolor=#E9E9E9
| 495538 ||  || — || August 2, 2013 || Haleakala || Pan-STARRS || HOF || align=right | 1.8 km || 
|-id=539 bgcolor=#E9E9E9
| 495539 ||  || — || November 8, 2010 || Kitt Peak || Spacewatch || MAR || align=right | 1.6 km || 
|-id=540 bgcolor=#d6d6d6
| 495540 ||  || — || April 18, 2012 || Kitt Peak || Spacewatch ||  || align=right | 3.0 km || 
|-id=541 bgcolor=#d6d6d6
| 495541 ||  || — || November 17, 2014 || Haleakala || Pan-STARRS ||  || align=right | 2.6 km || 
|-id=542 bgcolor=#d6d6d6
| 495542 ||  || — || November 17, 2008 || Kitt Peak || Spacewatch ||  || align=right | 2.7 km || 
|-id=543 bgcolor=#E9E9E9
| 495543 ||  || — || October 31, 2006 || Mount Lemmon || Mount Lemmon Survey ||  || align=right data-sort-value="0.77" | 770 m || 
|-id=544 bgcolor=#E9E9E9
| 495544 ||  || — || October 30, 2005 || Kitt Peak || Spacewatch ||  || align=right | 1.3 km || 
|-id=545 bgcolor=#d6d6d6
| 495545 ||  || — || October 9, 2008 || Kitt Peak || Spacewatch ||  || align=right | 2.5 km || 
|-id=546 bgcolor=#E9E9E9
| 495546 ||  || — || December 3, 2010 || Mount Lemmon || Mount Lemmon Survey ||  || align=right | 1.9 km || 
|-id=547 bgcolor=#d6d6d6
| 495547 ||  || — || April 1, 2010 || WISE || WISE ||  || align=right | 2.5 km || 
|-id=548 bgcolor=#E9E9E9
| 495548 ||  || — || November 4, 2005 || Kitt Peak || Spacewatch || HOF || align=right | 2.1 km || 
|-id=549 bgcolor=#fefefe
| 495549 ||  || — || July 14, 2004 || Siding Spring || SSS ||  || align=right data-sort-value="0.63" | 630 m || 
|-id=550 bgcolor=#E9E9E9
| 495550 ||  || — || February 28, 2012 || Haleakala || Pan-STARRS ||  || align=right | 1.2 km || 
|-id=551 bgcolor=#d6d6d6
| 495551 ||  || — || July 15, 2013 || Haleakala || Pan-STARRS ||  || align=right | 2.6 km || 
|-id=552 bgcolor=#FA8072
| 495552 ||  || — || June 15, 2010 || Siding Spring || SSS ||  || align=right data-sort-value="0.97" | 970 m || 
|-id=553 bgcolor=#E9E9E9
| 495553 ||  || — || November 7, 2010 || Mount Lemmon || Mount Lemmon Survey || KON || align=right | 1.1 km || 
|-id=554 bgcolor=#d6d6d6
| 495554 ||  || — || October 25, 2014 || Haleakala || Pan-STARRS ||  || align=right | 2.8 km || 
|-id=555 bgcolor=#d6d6d6
| 495555 ||  || — || November 9, 2009 || Kitt Peak || Spacewatch ||  || align=right | 3.3 km || 
|-id=556 bgcolor=#E9E9E9
| 495556 ||  || — || September 25, 2014 || Catalina || CSS || GEF || align=right | 2.4 km || 
|-id=557 bgcolor=#d6d6d6
| 495557 ||  || — || March 28, 2011 || Kitt Peak || Spacewatch ||  || align=right | 2.3 km || 
|-id=558 bgcolor=#d6d6d6
| 495558 ||  || — || November 20, 2014 || Haleakala || Pan-STARRS ||  || align=right | 2.8 km || 
|-id=559 bgcolor=#d6d6d6
| 495559 ||  || — || September 20, 2014 || Haleakala || Pan-STARRS ||  || align=right | 2.4 km || 
|-id=560 bgcolor=#d6d6d6
| 495560 ||  || — || April 2, 2011 || Mount Lemmon || Mount Lemmon Survey ||  || align=right | 3.1 km || 
|-id=561 bgcolor=#d6d6d6
| 495561 ||  || — || July 15, 2013 || Haleakala || Pan-STARRS || EOS || align=right | 2.4 km || 
|-id=562 bgcolor=#E9E9E9
| 495562 ||  || — || April 15, 2012 || Haleakala || Pan-STARRS ||  || align=right | 2.5 km || 
|-id=563 bgcolor=#d6d6d6
| 495563 ||  || — || April 30, 2012 || Kitt Peak || Spacewatch ||  || align=right | 2.9 km || 
|-id=564 bgcolor=#d6d6d6
| 495564 ||  || — || March 12, 2011 || Mount Lemmon || Mount Lemmon Survey || EOS || align=right | 2.5 km || 
|-id=565 bgcolor=#d6d6d6
| 495565 ||  || — || November 19, 2009 || Kitt Peak || Spacewatch ||  || align=right | 3.1 km || 
|-id=566 bgcolor=#E9E9E9
| 495566 ||  || — || December 6, 2010 || Mount Lemmon || Mount Lemmon Survey ||  || align=right data-sort-value="0.91" | 910 m || 
|-id=567 bgcolor=#d6d6d6
| 495567 ||  || — || April 4, 2010 || WISE || WISE || EUP || align=right | 2.7 km || 
|-id=568 bgcolor=#d6d6d6
| 495568 ||  || — || January 13, 2004 || Kitt Peak || Spacewatch || EOS || align=right | 4.4 km || 
|-id=569 bgcolor=#d6d6d6
| 495569 ||  || — || August 24, 2008 || Kitt Peak || Spacewatch ||  || align=right | 2.9 km || 
|-id=570 bgcolor=#E9E9E9
| 495570 ||  || — || September 27, 2005 || Socorro || LINEAR ||  || align=right | 2.3 km || 
|-id=571 bgcolor=#d6d6d6
| 495571 ||  || — || May 20, 2006 || Kitt Peak || Spacewatch ||  || align=right | 3.5 km || 
|-id=572 bgcolor=#E9E9E9
| 495572 ||  || — || October 26, 2005 || Kitt Peak || Spacewatch ||  || align=right | 1.4 km || 
|-id=573 bgcolor=#d6d6d6
| 495573 ||  || — || December 15, 2009 || Mount Lemmon || Mount Lemmon Survey || EOS || align=right | 3.2 km || 
|-id=574 bgcolor=#E9E9E9
| 495574 ||  || — || September 17, 2009 || Catalina || CSS ||  || align=right | 1.5 km || 
|-id=575 bgcolor=#d6d6d6
| 495575 ||  || — || February 13, 2010 || Mount Lemmon || Mount Lemmon Survey ||  || align=right | 3.3 km || 
|-id=576 bgcolor=#d6d6d6
| 495576 ||  || — || June 13, 2012 || Haleakala || Pan-STARRS ||  || align=right | 4.0 km || 
|-id=577 bgcolor=#d6d6d6
| 495577 ||  || — || November 26, 2009 || Mount Lemmon || Mount Lemmon Survey ||  || align=right | 3.1 km || 
|-id=578 bgcolor=#fefefe
| 495578 ||  || — || May 8, 2013 || Haleakala || Pan-STARRS ||  || align=right data-sort-value="0.89" | 890 m || 
|-id=579 bgcolor=#d6d6d6
| 495579 ||  || — || October 6, 2008 || Mount Lemmon || Mount Lemmon Survey ||  || align=right | 2.9 km || 
|-id=580 bgcolor=#d6d6d6
| 495580 ||  || — || December 20, 2014 || Kitt Peak || Spacewatch ||  || align=right | 3.2 km || 
|-id=581 bgcolor=#d6d6d6
| 495581 ||  || — || November 18, 2014 || Haleakala || Pan-STARRS ||  || align=right | 3.2 km || 
|-id=582 bgcolor=#d6d6d6
| 495582 ||  || — || November 18, 2009 || Mount Lemmon || Mount Lemmon Survey || EOS || align=right | 3.0 km || 
|-id=583 bgcolor=#d6d6d6
| 495583 ||  || — || January 15, 2004 || Kitt Peak || Spacewatch || LIX || align=right | 3.1 km || 
|-id=584 bgcolor=#E9E9E9
| 495584 ||  || — || November 22, 2006 || Mount Lemmon || Mount Lemmon Survey ||  || align=right | 1.0 km || 
|-id=585 bgcolor=#E9E9E9
| 495585 ||  || — || October 27, 2014 || Haleakala || Pan-STARRS ||  || align=right | 1.7 km || 
|-id=586 bgcolor=#d6d6d6
| 495586 ||  || — || July 13, 2013 || Haleakala || Pan-STARRS ||  || align=right | 3.6 km || 
|-id=587 bgcolor=#d6d6d6
| 495587 ||  || — || March 19, 2010 || WISE || WISE ||  || align=right | 2.7 km || 
|-id=588 bgcolor=#d6d6d6
| 495588 ||  || — || April 1, 2010 || WISE || WISE ||  || align=right | 3.3 km || 
|-id=589 bgcolor=#d6d6d6
| 495589 ||  || — || April 13, 2011 || Mount Lemmon || Mount Lemmon Survey ||  || align=right | 3.1 km || 
|-id=590 bgcolor=#d6d6d6
| 495590 ||  || — || January 15, 2010 || Mount Lemmon || Mount Lemmon Survey ||  || align=right | 3.2 km || 
|-id=591 bgcolor=#fefefe
| 495591 ||  || — || August 14, 2013 || Haleakala || Pan-STARRS ||  || align=right data-sort-value="0.85" | 850 m || 
|-id=592 bgcolor=#d6d6d6
| 495592 ||  || — || February 17, 2010 || Kitt Peak || Spacewatch ||  || align=right | 2.3 km || 
|-id=593 bgcolor=#d6d6d6
| 495593 ||  || — || February 14, 2004 || Kitt Peak || Spacewatch || HYG || align=right | 2.6 km || 
|-id=594 bgcolor=#E9E9E9
| 495594 ||  || — || June 21, 2012 || Catalina || CSS ||  || align=right | 2.9 km || 
|-id=595 bgcolor=#E9E9E9
| 495595 ||  || — || March 26, 2011 || Haleakala || Pan-STARRS ||  || align=right | 1.5 km || 
|-id=596 bgcolor=#d6d6d6
| 495596 ||  || — || November 7, 2008 || Mount Lemmon || Mount Lemmon Survey ||  || align=right | 2.5 km || 
|-id=597 bgcolor=#d6d6d6
| 495597 ||  || — || December 22, 2008 || Mount Lemmon || Mount Lemmon Survey ||  || align=right | 3.4 km || 
|-id=598 bgcolor=#d6d6d6
| 495598 ||  || — || December 19, 2003 || Kitt Peak || Spacewatch || VER || align=right | 4.5 km || 
|-id=599 bgcolor=#d6d6d6
| 495599 ||  || — || April 24, 2003 || Kitt Peak || Spacewatch || 7:4 || align=right | 3.6 km || 
|-id=600 bgcolor=#E9E9E9
| 495600 ||  || — || January 26, 2011 || Mount Lemmon || Mount Lemmon Survey || EUN || align=right | 1.3 km || 
|}

495601–495700 

|-bgcolor=#d6d6d6
| 495601 ||  || — || December 22, 2003 || Kitt Peak || Spacewatch || ARM || align=right | 3.0 km || 
|-id=602 bgcolor=#d6d6d6
| 495602 ||  || — || January 15, 2015 || Haleakala || Pan-STARRS ||  || align=right | 3.0 km || 
|-id=603 bgcolor=#C2E0FF
| 495603 ||  || — || March 13, 2010 || Haleakala || Pan-STARRS || res2:5 || align=right | 451 km || 
|-id=604 bgcolor=#d6d6d6
| 495604 ||  || — || December 4, 2008 || Kitt Peak || Spacewatch ||  || align=right | 3.6 km || 
|-id=605 bgcolor=#fefefe
| 495605 ||  || — || April 1, 2012 || Mount Lemmon || Mount Lemmon Survey ||  || align=right data-sort-value="0.70" | 700 m || 
|-id=606 bgcolor=#d6d6d6
| 495606 ||  || — || November 7, 2008 || Mount Lemmon || Mount Lemmon Survey || URS || align=right | 2.7 km || 
|-id=607 bgcolor=#d6d6d6
| 495607 ||  || — || October 25, 2013 || Mount Lemmon || Mount Lemmon Survey ||  || align=right | 3.3 km || 
|-id=608 bgcolor=#d6d6d6
| 495608 ||  || — || November 1, 2008 || Mount Lemmon || Mount Lemmon Survey ||  || align=right | 3.6 km || 
|-id=609 bgcolor=#fefefe
| 495609 ||  || — || December 27, 2006 || Mount Lemmon || Mount Lemmon Survey || H || align=right data-sort-value="0.75" | 750 m || 
|-id=610 bgcolor=#d6d6d6
| 495610 ||  || — || May 24, 2011 || Haleakala || Pan-STARRS ||  || align=right | 3.9 km || 
|-id=611 bgcolor=#fefefe
| 495611 ||  || — || March 28, 2008 || Kitt Peak || Spacewatch ||  || align=right data-sort-value="0.91" | 910 m || 
|-id=612 bgcolor=#fefefe
| 495612 ||  || — || May 23, 2006 || Kitt Peak || Spacewatch ||  || align=right data-sort-value="0.66" | 660 m || 
|-id=613 bgcolor=#C2E0FF
| 495613 ||  || — || March 25, 2014 || Haleakala || Pan-STARRS || other TNO || align=right | 377 km || 
|-id=614 bgcolor=#d6d6d6
| 495614 ||  || — || October 18, 2012 || Haleakala || Pan-STARRS ||  || align=right | 2.4 km || 
|-id=615 bgcolor=#FFC2E0
| 495615 ||  || — || July 13, 2015 || Haleakala || Pan-STARRS || ATE +1km || align=right | 1.0 km || 
|-id=616 bgcolor=#fefefe
| 495616 ||  || — || November 6, 2005 || Mount Lemmon || Mount Lemmon Survey ||  || align=right data-sort-value="0.72" | 720 m || 
|-id=617 bgcolor=#d6d6d6
| 495617 ||  || — || January 5, 2006 || Mount Lemmon || Mount Lemmon Survey ||  || align=right | 1.8 km || 
|-id=618 bgcolor=#fefefe
| 495618 ||  || — || April 16, 2004 || Kitt Peak || Spacewatch || H || align=right data-sort-value="0.52" | 520 m || 
|-id=619 bgcolor=#fefefe
| 495619 ||  || — || April 15, 2012 || Haleakala || Pan-STARRS || H || align=right data-sort-value="0.59" | 590 m || 
|-id=620 bgcolor=#d6d6d6
| 495620 ||  || — || October 8, 2015 || Haleakala || Pan-STARRS ||  || align=right | 2.2 km || 
|-id=621 bgcolor=#fefefe
| 495621 ||  || — || October 21, 2008 || Mount Lemmon || Mount Lemmon Survey ||  || align=right data-sort-value="0.78" | 780 m || 
|-id=622 bgcolor=#fefefe
| 495622 ||  || — || November 7, 2010 || Catalina || CSS || H || align=right data-sort-value="0.71" | 710 m || 
|-id=623 bgcolor=#fefefe
| 495623 ||  || — || September 7, 2008 || Mount Lemmon || Mount Lemmon Survey ||  || align=right data-sort-value="0.86" | 860 m || 
|-id=624 bgcolor=#fefefe
| 495624 ||  || — || August 29, 2015 || Haleakala || Pan-STARRS || H || align=right data-sort-value="0.62" | 620 m || 
|-id=625 bgcolor=#E9E9E9
| 495625 ||  || — || November 17, 2011 || Kitt Peak || Spacewatch ||  || align=right | 1.2 km || 
|-id=626 bgcolor=#E9E9E9
| 495626 ||  || — || December 17, 2003 || Socorro || LINEAR ||  || align=right | 1.4 km || 
|-id=627 bgcolor=#fefefe
| 495627 ||  || — || December 2, 2012 || Mount Lemmon || Mount Lemmon Survey ||  || align=right data-sort-value="0.56" | 560 m || 
|-id=628 bgcolor=#fefefe
| 495628 ||  || — || October 10, 2007 || Catalina || CSS || H || align=right data-sort-value="0.60" | 600 m || 
|-id=629 bgcolor=#fefefe
| 495629 ||  || — || December 29, 2008 || Mount Lemmon || Mount Lemmon Survey || NYS || align=right data-sort-value="0.66" | 660 m || 
|-id=630 bgcolor=#fefefe
| 495630 ||  || — || March 11, 1996 || Kitt Peak || Spacewatch ||  || align=right data-sort-value="0.58" | 580 m || 
|-id=631 bgcolor=#fefefe
| 495631 ||  || — || February 13, 2009 || Mount Lemmon || Mount Lemmon Survey || H || align=right data-sort-value="0.81" | 810 m || 
|-id=632 bgcolor=#E9E9E9
| 495632 ||  || — || November 25, 2011 || Haleakala || Pan-STARRS ||  || align=right | 1.0 km || 
|-id=633 bgcolor=#E9E9E9
| 495633 ||  || — || January 19, 2012 || Catalina || CSS ||  || align=right | 1.0 km || 
|-id=634 bgcolor=#d6d6d6
| 495634 ||  || — || December 2, 2010 || Kitt Peak || Spacewatch || THB || align=right | 2.5 km || 
|-id=635 bgcolor=#E9E9E9
| 495635 ||  || — || December 30, 2011 || Mount Lemmon || Mount Lemmon Survey ||  || align=right | 1.6 km || 
|-id=636 bgcolor=#fefefe
| 495636 ||  || — || December 4, 2015 || Mount Lemmon || Mount Lemmon Survey ||  || align=right | 1.1 km || 
|-id=637 bgcolor=#d6d6d6
| 495637 ||  || — || April 27, 2012 || Haleakala || Pan-STARRS ||  || align=right | 2.5 km || 
|-id=638 bgcolor=#E9E9E9
| 495638 ||  || — || April 30, 2009 || Mount Lemmon || Mount Lemmon Survey || HNS || align=right | 1.7 km || 
|-id=639 bgcolor=#E9E9E9
| 495639 ||  || — || January 21, 2012 || Haleakala || Pan-STARRS ||  || align=right | 1.8 km || 
|-id=640 bgcolor=#fefefe
| 495640 ||  || — || June 30, 2008 || Kitt Peak || Spacewatch ||  || align=right data-sort-value="0.53" | 530 m || 
|-id=641 bgcolor=#E9E9E9
| 495641 ||  || — || December 11, 2002 || Socorro || LINEAR ||  || align=right | 1.4 km || 
|-id=642 bgcolor=#E9E9E9
| 495642 ||  || — || November 18, 2007 || Kitt Peak || Spacewatch ||  || align=right data-sort-value="0.82" | 820 m || 
|-id=643 bgcolor=#E9E9E9
| 495643 ||  || — || April 12, 2013 || Haleakala || Pan-STARRS ||  || align=right data-sort-value="0.82" | 820 m || 
|-id=644 bgcolor=#E9E9E9
| 495644 ||  || — || January 19, 2008 || Mount Lemmon || Mount Lemmon Survey || EUN || align=right data-sort-value="0.96" | 960 m || 
|-id=645 bgcolor=#E9E9E9
| 495645 ||  || — || April 9, 2013 || Haleakala || Pan-STARRS || MAR || align=right | 1.3 km || 
|-id=646 bgcolor=#fefefe
| 495646 ||  || — || December 15, 2007 || Mount Lemmon || Mount Lemmon Survey ||  || align=right data-sort-value="0.80" | 800 m || 
|-id=647 bgcolor=#d6d6d6
| 495647 ||  || — || December 31, 2015 || Kitt Peak || Spacewatch ||  || align=right | 3.1 km || 
|-id=648 bgcolor=#E9E9E9
| 495648 ||  || — || October 14, 2014 || Mount Lemmon || Mount Lemmon Survey || WIT || align=right | 2.6 km || 
|-id=649 bgcolor=#E9E9E9
| 495649 ||  || — || December 21, 2006 || Catalina || CSS || HNS || align=right | 2.1 km || 
|-id=650 bgcolor=#fefefe
| 495650 ||  || — || September 24, 2011 || Haleakala || Pan-STARRS ||  || align=right data-sort-value="0.71" | 710 m || 
|-id=651 bgcolor=#d6d6d6
| 495651 ||  || — || October 28, 2014 || Haleakala || Pan-STARRS ||  || align=right | 2.4 km || 
|-id=652 bgcolor=#E9E9E9
| 495652 ||  || — || September 17, 2004 || Kitt Peak || Spacewatch || GEF || align=right | 3.0 km || 
|-id=653 bgcolor=#d6d6d6
| 495653 ||  || — || December 25, 2010 || Mount Lemmon || Mount Lemmon Survey ||  || align=right | 2.0 km || 
|-id=654 bgcolor=#E9E9E9
| 495654 ||  || — || December 18, 1995 || Kitt Peak || Spacewatch ||  || align=right data-sort-value="0.95" | 950 m || 
|-id=655 bgcolor=#d6d6d6
| 495655 ||  || — || January 15, 2005 || Kitt Peak || Spacewatch ||  || align=right | 2.1 km || 
|-id=656 bgcolor=#fefefe
| 495656 ||  || — || June 24, 2010 || Mount Lemmon || Mount Lemmon Survey ||  || align=right data-sort-value="0.92" | 920 m || 
|-id=657 bgcolor=#d6d6d6
| 495657 ||  || — || November 1, 2008 || Mount Lemmon || Mount Lemmon Survey ||  || align=right | 4.1 km || 
|-id=658 bgcolor=#d6d6d6
| 495658 ||  || — || February 12, 2010 || WISE || WISE ||  || align=right | 2.1 km || 
|-id=659 bgcolor=#E9E9E9
| 495659 ||  || — || August 21, 2006 || Kitt Peak || Spacewatch ||  || align=right | 1.6 km || 
|-id=660 bgcolor=#d6d6d6
| 495660 ||  || — || August 31, 2013 || Haleakala || Pan-STARRS ||  || align=right | 3.5 km || 
|-id=661 bgcolor=#E9E9E9
| 495661 ||  || — || November 26, 2005 || Mount Lemmon || Mount Lemmon Survey || HOF || align=right | 1.9 km || 
|-id=662 bgcolor=#d6d6d6
| 495662 ||  || — || January 26, 2011 || Mount Lemmon || Mount Lemmon Survey ||  || align=right | 2.2 km || 
|-id=663 bgcolor=#E9E9E9
| 495663 ||  || — || November 18, 2014 || Mount Lemmon || Mount Lemmon Survey || WIT || align=right | 2.0 km || 
|-id=664 bgcolor=#E9E9E9
| 495664 ||  || — || February 17, 2007 || Kitt Peak || Spacewatch || HOF || align=right | 1.9 km || 
|-id=665 bgcolor=#d6d6d6
| 495665 ||  || — || August 12, 2013 || Haleakala || Pan-STARRS || HYG || align=right | 2.3 km || 
|-id=666 bgcolor=#d6d6d6
| 495666 ||  || — || August 9, 2013 || Haleakala || Pan-STARRS ||  || align=right | 3.2 km || 
|-id=667 bgcolor=#E9E9E9
| 495667 ||  || — || January 26, 2007 || Kitt Peak || Spacewatch || WIT || align=right | 2.4 km || 
|-id=668 bgcolor=#d6d6d6
| 495668 ||  || — || June 8, 2008 || Kitt Peak || Spacewatch ||  || align=right | 3.1 km || 
|-id=669 bgcolor=#d6d6d6
| 495669 ||  || — || October 18, 2014 || Mount Lemmon || Mount Lemmon Survey ||  || align=right | 1.8 km || 
|-id=670 bgcolor=#E9E9E9
| 495670 ||  || — || December 14, 2001 || Socorro || LINEAR ||  || align=right | 3.1 km || 
|-id=671 bgcolor=#E9E9E9
| 495671 ||  || — || March 31, 2008 || Mount Lemmon || Mount Lemmon Survey ||  || align=right | 1.5 km || 
|-id=672 bgcolor=#d6d6d6
| 495672 ||  || — || February 29, 2000 || Socorro || LINEAR ||  || align=right | 2.9 km || 
|-id=673 bgcolor=#E9E9E9
| 495673 ||  || — || December 6, 2002 || Socorro || LINEAR ||  || align=right | 1.7 km || 
|-id=674 bgcolor=#d6d6d6
| 495674 ||  || — || February 28, 2010 || WISE || WISE ||  || align=right | 4.0 km || 
|-id=675 bgcolor=#fefefe
| 495675 ||  || — || October 12, 2007 || Catalina || CSS ||  || align=right | 1.3 km || 
|-id=676 bgcolor=#E9E9E9
| 495676 ||  || — || August 26, 2013 || Haleakala || Pan-STARRS ||  || align=right | 1.8 km || 
|-id=677 bgcolor=#d6d6d6
| 495677 ||  || — || January 8, 2011 || Mount Lemmon || Mount Lemmon Survey ||  || align=right | 2.8 km || 
|-id=678 bgcolor=#E9E9E9
| 495678 ||  || — || January 10, 2007 || Mount Lemmon || Mount Lemmon Survey ||  || align=right | 2.0 km || 
|-id=679 bgcolor=#E9E9E9
| 495679 ||  || — || February 15, 2012 || Haleakala || Pan-STARRS ||  || align=right data-sort-value="0.94" | 940 m || 
|-id=680 bgcolor=#d6d6d6
| 495680 ||  || — || September 16, 2003 || Kitt Peak || Spacewatch ||  || align=right | 2.3 km || 
|-id=681 bgcolor=#E9E9E9
| 495681 ||  || — || November 6, 2005 || Kitt Peak || Spacewatch || WIT || align=right | 2.2 km || 
|-id=682 bgcolor=#E9E9E9
| 495682 ||  || — || April 26, 2008 || Kitt Peak || Spacewatch ||  || align=right | 2.5 km || 
|-id=683 bgcolor=#d6d6d6
| 495683 ||  || — || March 28, 2011 || Catalina || CSS ||  || align=right | 2.8 km || 
|-id=684 bgcolor=#E9E9E9
| 495684 ||  || — || April 1, 2008 || Kitt Peak || Spacewatch ||  || align=right | 1.6 km || 
|-id=685 bgcolor=#E9E9E9
| 495685 ||  || — || February 2, 2008 || Kitt Peak || Spacewatch ||  || align=right data-sort-value="0.93" | 930 m || 
|-id=686 bgcolor=#E9E9E9
| 495686 ||  || — || November 19, 2006 || Kitt Peak || Spacewatch ||  || align=right data-sort-value="0.75" | 750 m || 
|-id=687 bgcolor=#d6d6d6
| 495687 ||  || — || December 25, 2005 || Mount Lemmon || Mount Lemmon Survey || KOR || align=right | 1.6 km || 
|-id=688 bgcolor=#d6d6d6
| 495688 ||  || — || March 5, 2011 || Catalina || CSS ||  || align=right | 2.9 km || 
|-id=689 bgcolor=#E9E9E9
| 495689 ||  || — || October 30, 2005 || Mount Lemmon || Mount Lemmon Survey ||  || align=right | 1.5 km || 
|-id=690 bgcolor=#E9E9E9
| 495690 ||  || — || October 14, 2014 || Mount Lemmon || Mount Lemmon Survey ||  || align=right | 2.1 km || 
|-id=691 bgcolor=#d6d6d6
| 495691 ||  || — || October 4, 2003 || Kitt Peak || Spacewatch ||  || align=right | 4.2 km || 
|-id=692 bgcolor=#E9E9E9
| 495692 ||  || — || May 2, 2008 || Kitt Peak || Spacewatch ||  || align=right | 1.9 km || 
|-id=693 bgcolor=#d6d6d6
| 495693 ||  || — || April 2, 2006 || Kitt Peak || Spacewatch ||  || align=right | 2.3 km || 
|-id=694 bgcolor=#d6d6d6
| 495694 ||  || — || March 6, 2011 || Mount Lemmon || Mount Lemmon Survey ||  || align=right | 2.9 km || 
|-id=695 bgcolor=#fefefe
| 495695 ||  || — || December 31, 2011 || Kitt Peak || Spacewatch ||  || align=right data-sort-value="0.73" | 730 m || 
|-id=696 bgcolor=#E9E9E9
| 495696 ||  || — || December 10, 2005 || Kitt Peak || Spacewatch || HOF || align=right | 1.9 km || 
|-id=697 bgcolor=#d6d6d6
| 495697 ||  || — || March 17, 2010 || WISE || WISE || HYG || align=right | 2.9 km || 
|-id=698 bgcolor=#E9E9E9
| 495698 ||  || — || January 17, 2007 || Kitt Peak || Spacewatch || EUN || align=right | 2.1 km || 
|-id=699 bgcolor=#d6d6d6
| 495699 ||  || — || May 24, 2006 || Kitt Peak || Spacewatch ||  || align=right | 2.9 km || 
|-id=700 bgcolor=#E9E9E9
| 495700 ||  || — || September 14, 2009 || Catalina || CSS ||  || align=right | 2.6 km || 
|}

495701–495800 

|-bgcolor=#d6d6d6
| 495701 ||  || — || December 19, 2004 || Mount Lemmon || Mount Lemmon Survey ||  || align=right | 3.3 km || 
|-id=702 bgcolor=#E9E9E9
| 495702 ||  || — || January 28, 2000 || Kitt Peak || Spacewatch ||  || align=right data-sort-value="0.91" | 910 m || 
|-id=703 bgcolor=#E9E9E9
| 495703 ||  || — || March 31, 2012 || Mount Lemmon || Mount Lemmon Survey ||  || align=right | 1.8 km || 
|-id=704 bgcolor=#E9E9E9
| 495704 ||  || — || October 2, 2014 || Haleakala || Pan-STARRS ||  || align=right | 1.8 km || 
|-id=705 bgcolor=#d6d6d6
| 495705 ||  || — || May 20, 2006 || Kitt Peak || Spacewatch ||  || align=right | 2.9 km || 
|-id=706 bgcolor=#E9E9E9
| 495706 ||  || — || November 22, 2005 || Kitt Peak || Spacewatch ||  || align=right | 2.1 km || 
|-id=707 bgcolor=#E9E9E9
| 495707 ||  || — || September 7, 2014 || Haleakala || Pan-STARRS || NEM || align=right | 2.4 km || 
|-id=708 bgcolor=#d6d6d6
| 495708 ||  || — || August 14, 2012 || Siding Spring || SSS ||  || align=right | 3.8 km || 
|-id=709 bgcolor=#d6d6d6
| 495709 ||  || — || March 14, 2010 || WISE || WISE ||  || align=right | 5.1 km || 
|-id=710 bgcolor=#fefefe
| 495710 ||  || — || April 17, 2013 || Haleakala || Pan-STARRS ||  || align=right data-sort-value="0.80" | 800 m || 
|-id=711 bgcolor=#d6d6d6
| 495711 ||  || — || October 11, 2005 || Kitt Peak || Spacewatch || 3:2 || align=right | 4.9 km || 
|-id=712 bgcolor=#d6d6d6
| 495712 ||  || — || March 10, 2010 || WISE || WISE ||  || align=right | 5.0 km || 
|-id=713 bgcolor=#d6d6d6
| 495713 ||  || — || April 30, 2010 || WISE || WISE ||  || align=right | 4.0 km || 
|-id=714 bgcolor=#d6d6d6
| 495714 ||  || — || February 9, 2011 || Kitt Peak || Spacewatch || EOS || align=right | 2.4 km || 
|-id=715 bgcolor=#d6d6d6
| 495715 ||  || — || October 17, 2009 || Mount Lemmon || Mount Lemmon Survey ||  || align=right | 2.4 km || 
|-id=716 bgcolor=#E9E9E9
| 495716 ||  || — || May 13, 2008 || Mount Lemmon || Mount Lemmon Survey ||  || align=right | 1.4 km || 
|-id=717 bgcolor=#E9E9E9
| 495717 ||  || — || October 25, 2005 || Kitt Peak || Spacewatch || WIT || align=right | 2.1 km || 
|-id=718 bgcolor=#fefefe
| 495718 ||  || — || October 25, 2011 || Haleakala || Pan-STARRS ||  || align=right data-sort-value="0.71" | 710 m || 
|-id=719 bgcolor=#d6d6d6
| 495719 ||  || — || May 23, 2006 || Kitt Peak || Spacewatch ||  || align=right | 2.8 km || 
|-id=720 bgcolor=#d6d6d6
| 495720 ||  || — || March 3, 2006 || Kitt Peak || Spacewatch ||  || align=right | 2.5 km || 
|-id=721 bgcolor=#fefefe
| 495721 ||  || — || December 14, 2001 || Socorro || LINEAR || H || align=right data-sort-value="0.93" | 930 m || 
|-id=722 bgcolor=#E9E9E9
| 495722 ||  || — || January 16, 2011 || Mount Lemmon || Mount Lemmon Survey ||  || align=right | 2.1 km || 
|-id=723 bgcolor=#E9E9E9
| 495723 ||  || — || February 25, 2007 || Mount Lemmon || Mount Lemmon Survey ||  || align=right | 2.1 km || 
|-id=724 bgcolor=#E9E9E9
| 495724 ||  || — || October 17, 2009 || Mount Lemmon || Mount Lemmon Survey || HOF || align=right | 1.7 km || 
|-id=725 bgcolor=#d6d6d6
| 495725 ||  || — || August 12, 2013 || Haleakala || Pan-STARRS ||  || align=right | 2.6 km || 
|-id=726 bgcolor=#d6d6d6
| 495726 ||  || — || May 27, 2012 || Mount Lemmon || Mount Lemmon Survey || EOS || align=right | 2.6 km || 
|-id=727 bgcolor=#d6d6d6
| 495727 ||  || — || April 7, 2010 || WISE || WISE ||  || align=right | 4.3 km || 
|-id=728 bgcolor=#E9E9E9
| 495728 ||  || — || October 21, 2014 || Kitt Peak || Spacewatch ||  || align=right data-sort-value="0.90" | 900 m || 
|-id=729 bgcolor=#E9E9E9
| 495729 ||  || — || January 30, 2011 || Haleakala || Pan-STARRS ||  || align=right | 1.8 km || 
|-id=730 bgcolor=#d6d6d6
| 495730 ||  || — || March 18, 2010 || WISE || WISE ||  || align=right | 2.7 km || 
|-id=731 bgcolor=#E9E9E9
| 495731 ||  || — || May 28, 2008 || Kitt Peak || Spacewatch ||  || align=right | 3.2 km || 
|-id=732 bgcolor=#E9E9E9
| 495732 ||  || — || September 1, 2005 || Kitt Peak || Spacewatch ||  || align=right | 1.6 km || 
|-id=733 bgcolor=#E9E9E9
| 495733 ||  || — || September 12, 2004 || Kitt Peak || Spacewatch || WIT || align=right | 2.1 km || 
|-id=734 bgcolor=#E9E9E9
| 495734 ||  || — || April 29, 2008 || Mount Lemmon || Mount Lemmon Survey || MIS || align=right | 1.6 km || 
|-id=735 bgcolor=#d6d6d6
| 495735 ||  || — || April 19, 2010 || WISE || WISE ||  || align=right | 4.1 km || 
|-id=736 bgcolor=#d6d6d6
| 495736 ||  || — || December 30, 2008 || Catalina || CSS ||  || align=right | 3.5 km || 
|-id=737 bgcolor=#E9E9E9
| 495737 ||  || — || February 29, 2008 || Catalina || CSS || BAR || align=right | 2.4 km || 
|-id=738 bgcolor=#d6d6d6
| 495738 ||  || — || January 15, 2004 || Kitt Peak || Spacewatch ||  || align=right | 3.4 km || 
|-id=739 bgcolor=#E9E9E9
| 495739 ||  || — || October 10, 2010 || Kitt Peak || Spacewatch ||  || align=right | 2.0 km || 
|-id=740 bgcolor=#d6d6d6
| 495740 ||  || — || March 14, 2011 || Mount Lemmon || Mount Lemmon Survey || EOS || align=right | 2.4 km || 
|-id=741 bgcolor=#d6d6d6
| 495741 ||  || — || October 10, 2004 || Kitt Peak || Spacewatch || KAR || align=right | 1.8 km || 
|-id=742 bgcolor=#d6d6d6
| 495742 ||  || — || March 13, 2011 || Kitt Peak || Spacewatch ||  || align=right | 2.4 km || 
|-id=743 bgcolor=#d6d6d6
| 495743 ||  || — || October 21, 2003 || Kitt Peak || Spacewatch ||  || align=right | 2.4 km || 
|-id=744 bgcolor=#d6d6d6
| 495744 ||  || — || November 21, 2009 || Mount Lemmon || Mount Lemmon Survey || EOS || align=right | 3.9 km || 
|-id=745 bgcolor=#d6d6d6
| 495745 ||  || — || January 2, 2009 || Mount Lemmon || Mount Lemmon Survey || 7:4 || align=right | 5.4 km || 
|-id=746 bgcolor=#d6d6d6
| 495746 ||  || — || February 4, 2011 || Haleakala || Pan-STARRS || KOR || align=right | 1.8 km || 
|-id=747 bgcolor=#E9E9E9
| 495747 ||  || — || February 28, 2012 || Haleakala || Pan-STARRS ||  || align=right | 1.4 km || 
|-id=748 bgcolor=#d6d6d6
| 495748 ||  || — || September 14, 2013 || Haleakala || Pan-STARRS || EMA || align=right | 2.9 km || 
|-id=749 bgcolor=#d6d6d6
| 495749 ||  || — || November 1, 2008 || Mount Lemmon || Mount Lemmon Survey || VER || align=right | 2.7 km || 
|-id=750 bgcolor=#d6d6d6
| 495750 ||  || — || August 11, 2012 || Haleakala || Pan-STARRS || EUP || align=right | 3.9 km || 
|-id=751 bgcolor=#d6d6d6
| 495751 ||  || — || November 20, 2014 || Haleakala || Pan-STARRS ||  || align=right | 2.6 km || 
|-id=752 bgcolor=#d6d6d6
| 495752 ||  || — || October 21, 2008 || Kitt Peak || Spacewatch ||  || align=right | 3.3 km || 
|-id=753 bgcolor=#fefefe
| 495753 ||  || — || October 3, 1999 || Catalina || CSS ||  || align=right data-sort-value="0.95" | 950 m || 
|-id=754 bgcolor=#d6d6d6
| 495754 ||  || — || May 3, 2005 || Kitt Peak || Spacewatch || THB || align=right | 2.9 km || 
|-id=755 bgcolor=#d6d6d6
| 495755 ||  || — || March 8, 2005 || Mount Lemmon || Mount Lemmon Survey || HYG || align=right | 2.8 km || 
|-id=756 bgcolor=#d6d6d6
| 495756 ||  || — || November 6, 2008 || Mount Lemmon || Mount Lemmon Survey ||  || align=right | 3.4 km || 
|-id=757 bgcolor=#fefefe
| 495757 ||  || — || November 25, 2009 || Kitt Peak || Spacewatch ||  || align=right data-sort-value="0.71" | 710 m || 
|-id=758 bgcolor=#d6d6d6
| 495758 ||  || — || February 5, 2011 || Catalina || CSS || EUP || align=right | 3.2 km || 
|-id=759 bgcolor=#E9E9E9
| 495759 Jandesselberger ||  ||  || February 10, 2013 || Tincana || M. Kusiak, M. Żołnowski ||  || align=right | 2.2 km || 
|-id=760 bgcolor=#FA8072
| 495760 ||  || — || February 17, 2010 || Kitt Peak || Spacewatch ||  || align=right | 1.0 km || 
|-id=761 bgcolor=#fefefe
| 495761 ||  || — || November 30, 2008 || Mount Lemmon || Mount Lemmon Survey ||  || align=right data-sort-value="0.86" | 860 m || 
|-id=762 bgcolor=#fefefe
| 495762 ||  || — || December 7, 2012 || Haleakala || Pan-STARRS ||  || align=right data-sort-value="0.90" | 900 m || 
|-id=763 bgcolor=#fefefe
| 495763 ||  || — || February 24, 2006 || Kitt Peak || Spacewatch ||  || align=right data-sort-value="0.70" | 700 m || 
|-id=764 bgcolor=#d6d6d6
| 495764 ||  || — || January 17, 2007 || Catalina || CSS ||  || align=right | 3.5 km || 
|-id=765 bgcolor=#E9E9E9
| 495765 ||  || — || June 7, 2013 || Haleakala || Pan-STARRS ||  || align=right | 1.9 km || 
|-id=766 bgcolor=#E9E9E9
| 495766 ||  || — || April 27, 2000 || Socorro || LINEAR || IAN || align=right | 1.5 km || 
|-id=767 bgcolor=#fefefe
| 495767 ||  || — || February 12, 2002 || Socorro || LINEAR ||  || align=right data-sort-value="0.91" | 910 m || 
|-id=768 bgcolor=#d6d6d6
| 495768 ||  || — || March 14, 2007 || Mount Lemmon || Mount Lemmon Survey ||  || align=right | 3.7 km || 
|-id=769 bgcolor=#d6d6d6
| 495769 ||  || — || January 16, 2010 || WISE || WISE ||  || align=right | 3.4 km || 
|-id=770 bgcolor=#fefefe
| 495770 ||  || — || November 4, 2004 || Kitt Peak || Spacewatch ||  || align=right | 1.0 km || 
|-id=771 bgcolor=#d6d6d6
| 495771 ||  || — || October 21, 2003 || Kitt Peak || Spacewatch || EOS || align=right | 4.0 km || 
|-id=772 bgcolor=#d6d6d6
| 495772 ||  || — || January 27, 2006 || Kitt Peak || Spacewatch ||  || align=right | 3.2 km || 
|-id=773 bgcolor=#E9E9E9
| 495773 ||  || — || May 21, 2005 || Mount Lemmon || Mount Lemmon Survey ||  || align=right | 1.2 km || 
|-id=774 bgcolor=#d6d6d6
| 495774 ||  || — || February 24, 2006 || Mount Lemmon || Mount Lemmon Survey || TIR || align=right | 3.5 km || 
|-id=775 bgcolor=#d6d6d6
| 495775 ||  || — || June 17, 2007 || Kitt Peak || Spacewatch ||  || align=right | 3.7 km || 
|-id=776 bgcolor=#E9E9E9
| 495776 ||  || — || March 14, 2004 || Kitt Peak || Spacewatch ||  || align=right | 1.6 km || 
|-id=777 bgcolor=#d6d6d6
| 495777 ||  || — || October 26, 2008 || Mount Lemmon || Mount Lemmon Survey || EOS || align=right | 4.0 km || 
|-id=778 bgcolor=#d6d6d6
| 495778 ||  || — || February 27, 2006 || Catalina || CSS || EUP || align=right | 3.2 km || 
|-id=779 bgcolor=#fefefe
| 495779 ||  || — || April 5, 2000 || Socorro || LINEAR ||  || align=right data-sort-value="0.91" | 910 m || 
|-id=780 bgcolor=#fefefe
| 495780 ||  || — || September 26, 2008 || Kitt Peak || Spacewatch ||  || align=right data-sort-value="0.91" | 910 m || 
|-id=781 bgcolor=#E9E9E9
| 495781 ||  || — || December 5, 2007 || Kitt Peak || Spacewatch || EUN || align=right | 1.6 km || 
|-id=782 bgcolor=#d6d6d6
| 495782 ||  || — || February 6, 2007 || Mount Lemmon || Mount Lemmon Survey ||  || align=right | 1.9 km || 
|-id=783 bgcolor=#fefefe
| 495783 ||  || — || December 8, 2005 || Kitt Peak || Spacewatch ||  || align=right | 1.6 km || 
|-id=784 bgcolor=#E9E9E9
| 495784 ||  || — || December 29, 2011 || Mount Lemmon || Mount Lemmon Survey ||  || align=right | 1.6 km || 
|-id=785 bgcolor=#E9E9E9
| 495785 ||  || — || May 14, 2004 || Kitt Peak || Spacewatch ||  || align=right | 2.6 km || 
|-id=786 bgcolor=#d6d6d6
| 495786 ||  || — || April 18, 2007 || Mount Lemmon || Mount Lemmon Survey ||  || align=right | 3.3 km || 
|-id=787 bgcolor=#E9E9E9
| 495787 ||  || — || January 13, 2008 || Kitt Peak || Spacewatch ||  || align=right | 1.6 km || 
|-id=788 bgcolor=#fefefe
| 495788 ||  || — || June 28, 2014 || Kitt Peak || Spacewatch ||  || align=right data-sort-value="0.78" | 780 m || 
|-id=789 bgcolor=#d6d6d6
| 495789 ||  || — || October 14, 2009 || Mount Lemmon || Mount Lemmon Survey || LIX || align=right | 2.9 km || 
|-id=790 bgcolor=#E9E9E9
| 495790 ||  || — || November 30, 2011 || Mount Lemmon || Mount Lemmon Survey ||  || align=right | 1.00 km || 
|-id=791 bgcolor=#E9E9E9
| 495791 ||  || — || April 16, 2013 || Haleakala || Pan-STARRS ||  || align=right | 1.7 km || 
|-id=792 bgcolor=#d6d6d6
| 495792 ||  || — || November 19, 2009 || Kitt Peak || Spacewatch ||  || align=right | 4.1 km || 
|-id=793 bgcolor=#d6d6d6
| 495793 ||  || — || May 12, 2007 || Kitt Peak || Spacewatch ||  || align=right | 4.2 km || 
|-id=794 bgcolor=#d6d6d6
| 495794 ||  || — || October 16, 2009 || Mount Lemmon || Mount Lemmon Survey ||  || align=right | 3.3 km || 
|-id=795 bgcolor=#E9E9E9
| 495795 ||  || — || November 29, 1997 || Kitt Peak || Spacewatch ||  || align=right | 3.1 km || 
|-id=796 bgcolor=#E9E9E9
| 495796 ||  || — || March 19, 2004 || Socorro || LINEAR ||  || align=right | 1.6 km || 
|-id=797 bgcolor=#d6d6d6
| 495797 ||  || — || January 7, 2006 || Kitt Peak || Spacewatch || TIR || align=right | 3.5 km || 
|-id=798 bgcolor=#fefefe
| 495798 ||  || — || May 20, 2006 || Siding Spring || SSS ||  || align=right data-sort-value="0.62" | 620 m || 
|-id=799 bgcolor=#fefefe
| 495799 ||  || — || March 6, 2013 || Haleakala || Pan-STARRS ||  || align=right data-sort-value="0.84" | 840 m || 
|-id=800 bgcolor=#E9E9E9
| 495800 ||  || — || April 11, 2013 || Mount Lemmon || Mount Lemmon Survey ||  || align=right data-sort-value="0.99" | 990 m || 
|}

495801–495900 

|-bgcolor=#d6d6d6
| 495801 ||  || — || October 26, 2009 || Mount Lemmon || Mount Lemmon Survey ||  || align=right | 3.7 km || 
|-id=802 bgcolor=#E9E9E9
| 495802 ||  || — || April 10, 2013 || Mount Lemmon || Mount Lemmon Survey ||  || align=right | 1.1 km || 
|-id=803 bgcolor=#fefefe
| 495803 ||  || — || February 9, 2010 || Mount Lemmon || Mount Lemmon Survey ||  || align=right data-sort-value="0.66" | 660 m || 
|-id=804 bgcolor=#fefefe
| 495804 ||  || — || October 21, 2003 || Socorro || LINEAR || H || align=right data-sort-value="0.57" | 570 m || 
|-id=805 bgcolor=#E9E9E9
| 495805 ||  || — || November 18, 2007 || Mount Lemmon || Mount Lemmon Survey ||  || align=right data-sort-value="0.90" | 900 m || 
|-id=806 bgcolor=#fefefe
| 495806 ||  || — || April 9, 2010 || Mount Lemmon || Mount Lemmon Survey ||  || align=right data-sort-value="0.95" | 950 m || 
|-id=807 bgcolor=#E9E9E9
| 495807 ||  || — || August 26, 2009 || Catalina || CSS ||  || align=right | 1.4 km || 
|-id=808 bgcolor=#fefefe
| 495808 ||  || — || April 4, 2003 || Kitt Peak || Spacewatch ||  || align=right data-sort-value="0.79" | 790 m || 
|-id=809 bgcolor=#d6d6d6
| 495809 ||  || — || February 20, 2012 || Haleakala || Pan-STARRS ||  || align=right | 3.2 km || 
|-id=810 bgcolor=#d6d6d6
| 495810 ||  || — || November 17, 2009 || Mount Lemmon || Mount Lemmon Survey || TIR || align=right | 3.2 km || 
|-id=811 bgcolor=#fefefe
| 495811 ||  || — || April 14, 2004 || Kitt Peak || Spacewatch || H || align=right data-sort-value="0.63" | 630 m || 
|-id=812 bgcolor=#E9E9E9
| 495812 ||  || — || April 16, 2013 || Haleakala || Pan-STARRS ||  || align=right | 1.0 km || 
|-id=813 bgcolor=#fefefe
| 495813 ||  || — || February 6, 2013 || Kitt Peak || Spacewatch ||  || align=right data-sort-value="0.82" | 820 m || 
|-id=814 bgcolor=#d6d6d6
| 495814 ||  || — || October 23, 2009 || Kitt Peak || Spacewatch ||  || align=right | 3.9 km || 
|-id=815 bgcolor=#fefefe
| 495815 ||  || — || March 17, 2004 || Kitt Peak || Spacewatch ||  || align=right data-sort-value="0.73" | 730 m || 
|-id=816 bgcolor=#E9E9E9
| 495816 ||  || — || August 7, 2010 || WISE || WISE ||  || align=right | 2.7 km || 
|-id=817 bgcolor=#d6d6d6
| 495817 ||  || — || November 21, 2014 || Haleakala || Pan-STARRS ||  || align=right | 3.5 km || 
|-id=818 bgcolor=#d6d6d6
| 495818 ||  || — || June 8, 2008 || Kitt Peak || Spacewatch ||  || align=right | 3.4 km || 
|-id=819 bgcolor=#fefefe
| 495819 ||  || — || April 21, 2006 || Catalina || CSS ||  || align=right data-sort-value="0.92" | 920 m || 
|-id=820 bgcolor=#E9E9E9
| 495820 ||  || — || September 2, 2010 || Mount Lemmon || Mount Lemmon Survey ||  || align=right | 1.6 km || 
|-id=821 bgcolor=#d6d6d6
| 495821 ||  || — || December 14, 1998 || Kitt Peak || Spacewatch || THB || align=right | 2.8 km || 
|-id=822 bgcolor=#d6d6d6
| 495822 ||  || — || September 22, 2009 || Mount Lemmon || Mount Lemmon Survey ||  || align=right | 3.3 km || 
|-id=823 bgcolor=#d6d6d6
| 495823 ||  || — || October 20, 2003 || Kitt Peak || Spacewatch ||  || align=right | 3.6 km || 
|-id=824 bgcolor=#d6d6d6
| 495824 ||  || — || December 3, 2010 || Kitt Peak || Spacewatch ||  || align=right | 2.7 km || 
|-id=825 bgcolor=#d6d6d6
| 495825 ||  || — || September 22, 2003 || Kitt Peak || Spacewatch || EOS || align=right | 2.8 km || 
|-id=826 bgcolor=#fefefe
| 495826 ||  || — || October 22, 2012 || Mount Lemmon || Mount Lemmon Survey ||  || align=right data-sort-value="0.72" | 720 m || 
|-id=827 bgcolor=#fefefe
| 495827 ||  || — || November 4, 2004 || Kitt Peak || Spacewatch ||  || align=right | 2.2 km || 
|-id=828 bgcolor=#d6d6d6
| 495828 ||  || — || March 7, 1981 || Siding Spring || S. J. Bus ||  || align=right | 2.2 km || 
|-id=829 bgcolor=#FFC2E0
| 495829 ||  || — || June 6, 1995 || Kitt Peak || Spacewatch || APOcritical || align=right data-sort-value="0.65" | 650 m || 
|-id=830 bgcolor=#fefefe
| 495830 ||  || — || October 9, 1999 || Socorro || LINEAR ||  || align=right data-sort-value="0.78" | 780 m || 
|-id=831 bgcolor=#FA8072
| 495831 ||  || — || January 5, 2000 || Socorro || LINEAR ||  || align=right data-sort-value="0.53" | 530 m || 
|-id=832 bgcolor=#FA8072
| 495832 ||  || — || May 7, 2000 || Socorro || LINEAR || 2:1Junusual || align=right | 1.5 km || 
|-id=833 bgcolor=#FFC2E0
| 495833 ||  || — || September 20, 2000 || Socorro || LINEAR || AMOcritical || align=right data-sort-value="0.59" | 590 m || 
|-id=834 bgcolor=#E9E9E9
| 495834 ||  || — || September 23, 2000 || Socorro || LINEAR ||  || align=right | 1.8 km || 
|-id=835 bgcolor=#d6d6d6
| 495835 ||  || — || September 25, 2000 || Socorro || LINEAR || Tj (2.95) || align=right | 3.5 km || 
|-id=836 bgcolor=#d6d6d6
| 495836 ||  || — || September 11, 2001 || Socorro || LINEAR ||  || align=right | 2.4 km || 
|-id=837 bgcolor=#E9E9E9
| 495837 ||  || — || September 21, 2001 || Socorro || LINEAR ||  || align=right | 1.3 km || 
|-id=838 bgcolor=#d6d6d6
| 495838 ||  || — || November 15, 2001 || Socorro || LINEAR ||  || align=right | 2.7 km || 
|-id=839 bgcolor=#E9E9E9
| 495839 ||  || — || November 12, 2001 || Socorro || LINEAR ||  || align=right | 2.0 km || 
|-id=840 bgcolor=#E9E9E9
| 495840 ||  || — || November 17, 2001 || Socorro || LINEAR ||  || align=right | 1.2 km || 
|-id=841 bgcolor=#E9E9E9
| 495841 ||  || — || November 18, 2001 || Socorro || LINEAR ||  || align=right | 1.9 km || 
|-id=842 bgcolor=#d6d6d6
| 495842 ||  || — || December 14, 2001 || Kingsnake || J. V. McClusky ||  || align=right | 4.1 km || 
|-id=843 bgcolor=#E9E9E9
| 495843 ||  || — || November 19, 2001 || Anderson Mesa || LONEOS ||  || align=right | 1.7 km || 
|-id=844 bgcolor=#fefefe
| 495844 ||  || — || January 5, 2002 || Kitt Peak || Spacewatch ||  || align=right | 1.0 km || 
|-id=845 bgcolor=#fefefe
| 495845 ||  || — || August 15, 2002 || Vicques || M. Ory ||  || align=right data-sort-value="0.78" | 780 m || 
|-id=846 bgcolor=#fefefe
| 495846 ||  || — || August 11, 2002 || Palomar || NEAT ||  || align=right data-sort-value="0.83" | 830 m || 
|-id=847 bgcolor=#fefefe
| 495847 ||  || — || August 8, 2002 || Palomar || NEAT ||  || align=right data-sort-value="0.60" | 600 m || 
|-id=848 bgcolor=#FFC2E0
| 495848 ||  || — || August 20, 2002 || Socorro || LINEAR || APO +1km || align=right data-sort-value="0.89" | 890 m || 
|-id=849 bgcolor=#d6d6d6
| 495849 ||  || — || August 16, 2002 || Palomar || NEAT ||  || align=right | 2.8 km || 
|-id=850 bgcolor=#d6d6d6
| 495850 ||  || — || September 13, 2002 || Kitt Peak || Spacewatch || 3:2 || align=right | 3.3 km || 
|-id=851 bgcolor=#FA8072
| 495851 ||  || — || October 9, 2002 || Socorro || LINEAR ||  || align=right data-sort-value="0.92" | 920 m || 
|-id=852 bgcolor=#fefefe
| 495852 ||  || — || October 3, 2002 || Palomar || NEAT ||  || align=right data-sort-value="0.73" | 730 m || 
|-id=853 bgcolor=#d6d6d6
| 495853 ||  || — || October 11, 2002 || Socorro || LINEAR ||  || align=right | 3.2 km || 
|-id=854 bgcolor=#d6d6d6
| 495854 ||  || — || April 24, 2003 || Kitt Peak || Spacewatch ||  || align=right | 2.7 km || 
|-id=855 bgcolor=#E9E9E9
| 495855 ||  || — || May 23, 2003 || Kitt Peak || Spacewatch ||  || align=right | 2.1 km || 
|-id=856 bgcolor=#FA8072
| 495856 ||  || — || May 27, 2003 || Nogales || M. Schwartz, P. R. Holvorcem ||  || align=right data-sort-value="0.37" | 370 m || 
|-id=857 bgcolor=#FFC2E0
| 495857 ||  || — || June 23, 2003 || Kitt Peak || Spacewatch || AMOcritical || align=right data-sort-value="0.56" | 560 m || 
|-id=858 bgcolor=#FFC2E0
| 495858 ||  || — || June 27, 2003 || Socorro || LINEAR || APOcritical || align=right data-sort-value="0.34" | 340 m || 
|-id=859 bgcolor=#d6d6d6
| 495859 ||  || — || September 20, 2003 || Socorro || LINEAR || 3:2 || align=right | 4.3 km || 
|-id=860 bgcolor=#d6d6d6
| 495860 ||  || — || September 17, 2003 || Anderson Mesa || LONEOS ||  || align=right | 3.1 km || 
|-id=861 bgcolor=#FA8072
| 495861 ||  || — || October 16, 2003 || Palomar || NEAT ||  || align=right data-sort-value="0.72" | 720 m || 
|-id=862 bgcolor=#d6d6d6
| 495862 ||  || — || November 21, 2003 || Palomar || NEAT ||  || align=right | 2.9 km || 
|-id=863 bgcolor=#FA8072
| 495863 ||  || — || December 1, 2003 || Kitt Peak || Spacewatch ||  || align=right data-sort-value="0.76" | 760 m || 
|-id=864 bgcolor=#E9E9E9
| 495864 ||  || — || February 10, 2004 || Catalina || CSS ||  || align=right data-sort-value="0.95" | 950 m || 
|-id=865 bgcolor=#E9E9E9
| 495865 ||  || — || April 14, 2004 || Kitt Peak || Spacewatch ||  || align=right | 1.3 km || 
|-id=866 bgcolor=#FA8072
| 495866 ||  || — || June 16, 2004 || Socorro || LINEAR ||  || align=right | 2.8 km || 
|-id=867 bgcolor=#E9E9E9
| 495867 ||  || — || July 11, 2004 || Socorro || LINEAR ||  || align=right | 1.5 km || 
|-id=868 bgcolor=#fefefe
| 495868 ||  || — || August 7, 2004 || Palomar || NEAT || critical || align=right data-sort-value="0.62" | 620 m || 
|-id=869 bgcolor=#E9E9E9
| 495869 ||  || — || August 10, 2004 || Socorro || LINEAR ||  || align=right | 1.6 km || 
|-id=870 bgcolor=#E9E9E9
| 495870 ||  || — || August 10, 2004 || Campo Imperatore || CINEOS ||  || align=right | 1.8 km || 
|-id=871 bgcolor=#FA8072
| 495871 ||  || — || September 8, 2004 || Socorro || LINEAR ||  || align=right data-sort-value="0.55" | 550 m || 
|-id=872 bgcolor=#E9E9E9
| 495872 ||  || — || August 22, 2004 || Kitt Peak || Spacewatch ||  || align=right | 1.4 km || 
|-id=873 bgcolor=#E9E9E9
| 495873 ||  || — || September 8, 2004 || Socorro || LINEAR ||  || align=right | 2.1 km || 
|-id=874 bgcolor=#d6d6d6
| 495874 ||  || — || September 8, 2004 || Socorro || LINEAR ||  || align=right | 2.3 km || 
|-id=875 bgcolor=#E9E9E9
| 495875 ||  || — || September 8, 2004 || Palomar || NEAT || BAR || align=right | 1.2 km || 
|-id=876 bgcolor=#fefefe
| 495876 ||  || — || September 6, 2004 || Socorro || LINEAR ||  || align=right data-sort-value="0.87" | 870 m || 
|-id=877 bgcolor=#d6d6d6
| 495877 ||  || — || August 25, 2004 || Kitt Peak || Spacewatch ||  || align=right | 1.7 km || 
|-id=878 bgcolor=#fefefe
| 495878 ||  || — || September 9, 2004 || Socorro || LINEAR ||  || align=right data-sort-value="0.60" | 600 m || 
|-id=879 bgcolor=#fefefe
| 495879 ||  || — || September 10, 2004 || Socorro || LINEAR ||  || align=right data-sort-value="0.89" | 890 m || 
|-id=880 bgcolor=#E9E9E9
| 495880 ||  || — || August 12, 2004 || Socorro || LINEAR ||  || align=right | 2.1 km || 
|-id=881 bgcolor=#E9E9E9
| 495881 ||  || — || September 11, 2004 || Socorro || LINEAR ||  || align=right | 1.7 km || 
|-id=882 bgcolor=#E9E9E9
| 495882 ||  || — || September 11, 2004 || Socorro || LINEAR ||  || align=right | 1.5 km || 
|-id=883 bgcolor=#E9E9E9
| 495883 ||  || — || September 12, 2004 || Socorro || LINEAR ||  || align=right | 1.8 km || 
|-id=884 bgcolor=#fefefe
| 495884 ||  || — || September 15, 2004 || Kitt Peak || Spacewatch ||  || align=right data-sort-value="0.63" | 630 m || 
|-id=885 bgcolor=#E9E9E9
| 495885 ||  || — || September 16, 2004 || Anderson Mesa || LONEOS ||  || align=right | 1.5 km || 
|-id=886 bgcolor=#E9E9E9
| 495886 ||  || — || August 27, 2004 || Anderson Mesa || LONEOS ||  || align=right | 1.4 km || 
|-id=887 bgcolor=#E9E9E9
| 495887 ||  || — || October 4, 2004 || Kitt Peak || Spacewatch ||  || align=right | 1.7 km || 
|-id=888 bgcolor=#E9E9E9
| 495888 ||  || — || October 8, 2004 || Anderson Mesa || LONEOS ||  || align=right | 1.6 km || 
|-id=889 bgcolor=#E9E9E9
| 495889 ||  || — || September 10, 2004 || Kitt Peak || Spacewatch ||  || align=right | 1.7 km || 
|-id=890 bgcolor=#E9E9E9
| 495890 ||  || — || October 9, 2004 || Kitt Peak || Spacewatch ||  || align=right | 2.2 km || 
|-id=891 bgcolor=#FFC2E0
| 495891 ||  || — || November 10, 2004 || Socorro || LINEAR || AMO || align=right data-sort-value="0.74" | 740 m || 
|-id=892 bgcolor=#fefefe
| 495892 ||  || — || November 3, 2004 || Anderson Mesa || LONEOS ||  || align=right data-sort-value="0.75" | 750 m || 
|-id=893 bgcolor=#fefefe
| 495893 ||  || — || December 2, 2004 || Catalina || CSS ||  || align=right data-sort-value="0.69" | 690 m || 
|-id=894 bgcolor=#fefefe
| 495894 ||  || — || December 11, 2004 || Kitt Peak || Spacewatch ||  || align=right | 1.3 km || 
|-id=895 bgcolor=#d6d6d6
| 495895 ||  || — || April 9, 2005 || Kitt Peak || Spacewatch || URS || align=right | 2.9 km || 
|-id=896 bgcolor=#fefefe
| 495896 ||  || — || June 13, 2005 || Mount Lemmon || Mount Lemmon Survey || MAS || align=right data-sort-value="0.81" | 810 m || 
|-id=897 bgcolor=#d6d6d6
| 495897 ||  || — || June 27, 2005 || Palomar || NEAT || Tj (2.96) || align=right | 4.9 km || 
|-id=898 bgcolor=#E9E9E9
| 495898 ||  || — || July 1, 2005 || Kitt Peak || Spacewatch ||  || align=right data-sort-value="0.98" | 980 m || 
|-id=899 bgcolor=#E9E9E9
| 495899 ||  || — || June 17, 2005 || Mount Lemmon || Mount Lemmon Survey ||  || align=right data-sort-value="0.93" | 930 m || 
|-id=900 bgcolor=#E9E9E9
| 495900 ||  || — || August 27, 2005 || Kitt Peak || Spacewatch ||  || align=right | 1.7 km || 
|}

495901–496000 

|-bgcolor=#fefefe
| 495901 ||  || — || August 27, 2005 || Palomar || NEAT ||  || align=right data-sort-value="0.56" | 560 m || 
|-id=902 bgcolor=#E9E9E9
| 495902 ||  || — || August 27, 2005 || Palomar || NEAT ||  || align=right data-sort-value="0.74" | 740 m || 
|-id=903 bgcolor=#E9E9E9
| 495903 ||  || — || August 28, 2005 || Kitt Peak || Spacewatch ||  || align=right data-sort-value="0.85" | 850 m || 
|-id=904 bgcolor=#E9E9E9
| 495904 ||  || — || September 12, 2005 || 7300 || 7300 Obs. ||  || align=right | 1.5 km || 
|-id=905 bgcolor=#E9E9E9
| 495905 ||  || — || September 24, 2005 || Kitt Peak || Spacewatch ||  || align=right | 1.6 km || 
|-id=906 bgcolor=#E9E9E9
| 495906 ||  || — || September 26, 2005 || Kitt Peak || Spacewatch ||  || align=right | 1.3 km || 
|-id=907 bgcolor=#E9E9E9
| 495907 ||  || — || September 29, 2005 || Mount Lemmon || Mount Lemmon Survey ||  || align=right | 1.7 km || 
|-id=908 bgcolor=#E9E9E9
| 495908 ||  || — || September 22, 2005 || Palomar || NEAT ||  || align=right data-sort-value="0.68" | 680 m || 
|-id=909 bgcolor=#fefefe
| 495909 ||  || — || September 26, 2005 || Kitt Peak || Spacewatch || H || align=right data-sort-value="0.59" | 590 m || 
|-id=910 bgcolor=#E9E9E9
| 495910 ||  || — || October 7, 2005 || Kitt Peak || Spacewatch ||  || align=right data-sort-value="0.82" | 820 m || 
|-id=911 bgcolor=#E9E9E9
| 495911 ||  || — || October 25, 2005 || Kitt Peak || Spacewatch ||  || align=right data-sort-value="0.88" | 880 m || 
|-id=912 bgcolor=#E9E9E9
| 495912 ||  || — || October 25, 2005 || Kitt Peak || Spacewatch || KRM || align=right | 1.1 km || 
|-id=913 bgcolor=#E9E9E9
| 495913 ||  || — || October 25, 2005 || Kitt Peak || Spacewatch ||  || align=right | 1.5 km || 
|-id=914 bgcolor=#E9E9E9
| 495914 ||  || — || October 25, 2005 || Kitt Peak || Spacewatch ||  || align=right | 1.2 km || 
|-id=915 bgcolor=#E9E9E9
| 495915 ||  || — || October 25, 2005 || Kitt Peak || Spacewatch ||  || align=right | 1.6 km || 
|-id=916 bgcolor=#E9E9E9
| 495916 ||  || — || October 26, 2005 || Kitt Peak || Spacewatch ||  || align=right | 2.2 km || 
|-id=917 bgcolor=#E9E9E9
| 495917 ||  || — || October 29, 2005 || Mount Lemmon || Mount Lemmon Survey || EUN || align=right | 1.9 km || 
|-id=918 bgcolor=#E9E9E9
| 495918 ||  || — || October 22, 2005 || Catalina || CSS || ADE || align=right | 1.5 km || 
|-id=919 bgcolor=#E9E9E9
| 495919 ||  || — || October 24, 2005 || Kitt Peak || Spacewatch || WIT || align=right | 1.3 km || 
|-id=920 bgcolor=#E9E9E9
| 495920 ||  || — || November 2, 2005 || Catalina || CSS || IAN || align=right | 1.2 km || 
|-id=921 bgcolor=#fefefe
| 495921 ||  || — || November 1, 2005 || Mount Lemmon || Mount Lemmon Survey || NYS || align=right data-sort-value="0.57" | 570 m || 
|-id=922 bgcolor=#E9E9E9
| 495922 ||  || — || November 6, 2005 || Mount Lemmon || Mount Lemmon Survey || GEF || align=right | 1.7 km || 
|-id=923 bgcolor=#fefefe
| 495923 ||  || — || November 25, 2005 || Kitt Peak || Spacewatch ||  || align=right data-sort-value="0.51" | 510 m || 
|-id=924 bgcolor=#E9E9E9
| 495924 ||  || — || November 30, 2005 || Socorro || LINEAR ||  || align=right | 2.5 km || 
|-id=925 bgcolor=#d6d6d6
| 495925 ||  || — || December 26, 2005 || Kitt Peak || Spacewatch || THM || align=right | 2.1 km || 
|-id=926 bgcolor=#E9E9E9
| 495926 ||  || — || December 25, 2005 || Mount Lemmon || Mount Lemmon Survey || MRX || align=right | 1.6 km || 
|-id=927 bgcolor=#E9E9E9
| 495927 ||  || — || December 3, 2000 || Kitt Peak || Spacewatch ||  || align=right | 2.3 km || 
|-id=928 bgcolor=#E9E9E9
| 495928 ||  || — || December 24, 2005 || Kitt Peak || Spacewatch ||  || align=right | 2.7 km || 
|-id=929 bgcolor=#E9E9E9
| 495929 ||  || — || December 30, 2005 || Kitt Peak || Spacewatch ||  || align=right | 2.2 km || 
|-id=930 bgcolor=#FFC2E0
| 495930 ||  || — || January 5, 2006 || Socorro || LINEAR || APO || align=right data-sort-value="0.39" | 390 m || 
|-id=931 bgcolor=#d6d6d6
| 495931 ||  || — || February 27, 2006 || Kitt Peak || Spacewatch ||  || align=right | 1.7 km || 
|-id=932 bgcolor=#fefefe
| 495932 ||  || — || January 8, 2006 || Mount Lemmon || Mount Lemmon Survey ||  || align=right data-sort-value="0.78" | 780 m || 
|-id=933 bgcolor=#fefefe
| 495933 ||  || — || April 2, 2006 || Kitt Peak || Spacewatch ||  || align=right data-sort-value="0.60" | 600 m || 
|-id=934 bgcolor=#fefefe
| 495934 ||  || — || April 26, 2006 || Kitt Peak || Spacewatch ||  || align=right data-sort-value="0.63" | 630 m || 
|-id=935 bgcolor=#d6d6d6
| 495935 ||  || — || May 1, 2006 || Kitt Peak || Spacewatch ||  || align=right | 2.4 km || 
|-id=936 bgcolor=#d6d6d6
| 495936 ||  || — || May 9, 2006 || Mount Lemmon || Mount Lemmon Survey || EOS || align=right | 2.6 km || 
|-id=937 bgcolor=#d6d6d6
| 495937 ||  || — || May 27, 2006 || Kitt Peak || Spacewatch ||  || align=right | 3.1 km || 
|-id=938 bgcolor=#fefefe
| 495938 ||  || — || August 27, 2006 || Kitt Peak || Spacewatch ||  || align=right data-sort-value="0.78" | 780 m || 
|-id=939 bgcolor=#d6d6d6
| 495939 ||  || — || May 8, 2006 || Mount Lemmon || Mount Lemmon Survey ||  || align=right | 3.4 km || 
|-id=940 bgcolor=#fefefe
| 495940 ||  || — || August 18, 2006 || Kitt Peak || Spacewatch || NYS || align=right data-sort-value="0.58" | 580 m || 
|-id=941 bgcolor=#fefefe
| 495941 ||  || — || September 11, 2006 || Catalina || CSS ||  || align=right data-sort-value="0.93" | 930 m || 
|-id=942 bgcolor=#fefefe
| 495942 ||  || — || September 15, 2006 || Kitt Peak || Spacewatch ||  || align=right data-sort-value="0.55" | 550 m || 
|-id=943 bgcolor=#fefefe
| 495943 ||  || — || September 15, 2006 || Kitt Peak || Spacewatch ||  || align=right data-sort-value="0.75" | 750 m || 
|-id=944 bgcolor=#fefefe
| 495944 ||  || — || September 24, 2006 || Anderson Mesa || LONEOS ||  || align=right data-sort-value="0.65" | 650 m || 
|-id=945 bgcolor=#fefefe
| 495945 ||  || — || July 21, 2006 || Mount Lemmon || Mount Lemmon Survey ||  || align=right data-sort-value="0.66" | 660 m || 
|-id=946 bgcolor=#d6d6d6
| 495946 ||  || — || September 19, 2006 || Catalina || CSS || THB || align=right | 2.7 km || 
|-id=947 bgcolor=#E9E9E9
| 495947 ||  || — || October 16, 2006 || Kitt Peak || Spacewatch || ADE || align=right | 1.7 km || 
|-id=948 bgcolor=#E9E9E9
| 495948 ||  || — || October 4, 2006 || Mount Lemmon || Mount Lemmon Survey ||  || align=right data-sort-value="0.71" | 710 m || 
|-id=949 bgcolor=#fefefe
| 495949 ||  || — || October 17, 2006 || Mount Lemmon || Mount Lemmon Survey ||  || align=right data-sort-value="0.71" | 710 m || 
|-id=950 bgcolor=#fefefe
| 495950 ||  || — || October 20, 2006 || Mount Lemmon || Mount Lemmon Survey ||  || align=right data-sort-value="0.84" | 840 m || 
|-id=951 bgcolor=#d6d6d6
| 495951 ||  || — || September 28, 2006 || Catalina || CSS ||  || align=right | 3.1 km || 
|-id=952 bgcolor=#E9E9E9
| 495952 ||  || — || November 16, 2006 || Mount Lemmon || Mount Lemmon Survey ||  || align=right data-sort-value="0.94" | 940 m || 
|-id=953 bgcolor=#E9E9E9
| 495953 ||  || — || November 19, 2006 || Kitt Peak || Spacewatch ||  || align=right data-sort-value="0.73" | 730 m || 
|-id=954 bgcolor=#FA8072
| 495954 ||  || — || December 21, 2006 || Catalina || CSS ||  || align=right | 1.8 km || 
|-id=955 bgcolor=#E9E9E9
| 495955 ||  || — || January 25, 2007 || Catalina || CSS ||  || align=right | 3.0 km || 
|-id=956 bgcolor=#d6d6d6
| 495956 ||  || — || February 17, 2007 || Kitt Peak || Spacewatch ||  || align=right | 2.4 km || 
|-id=957 bgcolor=#E9E9E9
| 495957 ||  || — || March 10, 2007 || Kitt Peak || Spacewatch ||  || align=right | 2.2 km || 
|-id=958 bgcolor=#d6d6d6
| 495958 ||  || — || June 9, 2007 || Kitt Peak || Spacewatch ||  || align=right | 2.3 km || 
|-id=959 bgcolor=#FFC2E0
| 495959 ||  || — || June 21, 2007 || Socorro || LINEAR || AMO || align=right data-sort-value="0.66" | 660 m || 
|-id=960 bgcolor=#FFC2E0
| 495960 ||  || — || June 24, 2007 || Socorro || LINEAR || APO || align=right data-sort-value="0.62" | 620 m || 
|-id=961 bgcolor=#fefefe
| 495961 ||  || — || August 9, 2007 || Kitt Peak || Spacewatch ||  || align=right data-sort-value="0.71" | 710 m || 
|-id=962 bgcolor=#fefefe
| 495962 ||  || — || September 4, 2007 || La Sagra || OAM Obs. ||  || align=right data-sort-value="0.72" | 720 m || 
|-id=963 bgcolor=#fefefe
| 495963 ||  || — || September 9, 2007 || Kitt Peak || Spacewatch ||  || align=right data-sort-value="0.52" | 520 m || 
|-id=964 bgcolor=#fefefe
| 495964 ||  || — || September 9, 2007 || Kitt Peak || Spacewatch ||  || align=right data-sort-value="0.56" | 560 m || 
|-id=965 bgcolor=#d6d6d6
| 495965 ||  || — || September 13, 2007 || Altschwendt || W. Ries || VER || align=right | 2.7 km || 
|-id=966 bgcolor=#FA8072
| 495966 ||  || — || September 14, 2007 || Socorro || LINEAR ||  || align=right data-sort-value="0.56" | 560 m || 
|-id=967 bgcolor=#fefefe
| 495967 ||  || — || August 23, 2007 || Kitt Peak || Spacewatch || MAS || align=right data-sort-value="0.65" | 650 m || 
|-id=968 bgcolor=#fefefe
| 495968 ||  || — || September 12, 2007 || Mount Lemmon || Mount Lemmon Survey ||  || align=right data-sort-value="0.56" | 560 m || 
|-id=969 bgcolor=#d6d6d6
| 495969 ||  || — || September 15, 2007 || Kitt Peak || Spacewatch || HYG || align=right | 2.3 km || 
|-id=970 bgcolor=#d6d6d6
| 495970 ||  || — || September 12, 2007 || Mount Lemmon || Mount Lemmon Survey ||  || align=right | 2.3 km || 
|-id=971 bgcolor=#fefefe
| 495971 ||  || — || September 14, 2007 || Anderson Mesa || LONEOS ||  || align=right data-sort-value="0.65" | 650 m || 
|-id=972 bgcolor=#d6d6d6
| 495972 ||  || — || October 6, 2007 || Socorro || LINEAR ||  || align=right | 3.1 km || 
|-id=973 bgcolor=#FA8072
| 495973 ||  || — || October 6, 2007 || Socorro || LINEAR ||  || align=right data-sort-value="0.63" | 630 m || 
|-id=974 bgcolor=#d6d6d6
| 495974 ||  || — || September 9, 2007 || Mount Lemmon || Mount Lemmon Survey ||  || align=right | 3.4 km || 
|-id=975 bgcolor=#d6d6d6
| 495975 ||  || — || October 5, 2007 || Kitt Peak || Spacewatch ||  || align=right | 2.6 km || 
|-id=976 bgcolor=#fefefe
| 495976 ||  || — || October 7, 2007 || Mount Lemmon || Mount Lemmon Survey ||  || align=right data-sort-value="0.79" | 790 m || 
|-id=977 bgcolor=#d6d6d6
| 495977 ||  || — || September 13, 2007 || Catalina || CSS ||  || align=right | 3.1 km || 
|-id=978 bgcolor=#fefefe
| 495978 ||  || — || October 6, 2007 || Kitt Peak || Spacewatch ||  || align=right data-sort-value="0.60" | 600 m || 
|-id=979 bgcolor=#fefefe
| 495979 ||  || — || October 4, 2007 || Kitt Peak || Spacewatch ||  || align=right data-sort-value="0.69" | 690 m || 
|-id=980 bgcolor=#fefefe
| 495980 ||  || — || October 9, 2007 || Kitt Peak || Spacewatch ||  || align=right data-sort-value="0.72" | 720 m || 
|-id=981 bgcolor=#d6d6d6
| 495981 ||  || — || October 11, 2007 || Mount Lemmon || Mount Lemmon Survey ||  || align=right | 2.6 km || 
|-id=982 bgcolor=#d6d6d6
| 495982 ||  || — || October 11, 2007 || Kitt Peak || Spacewatch ||  || align=right | 3.1 km || 
|-id=983 bgcolor=#fefefe
| 495983 ||  || — || October 11, 2007 || Kitt Peak || Spacewatch ||  || align=right data-sort-value="0.49" | 490 m || 
|-id=984 bgcolor=#d6d6d6
| 495984 ||  || — || October 15, 2007 || Kitt Peak || Spacewatch || EOS || align=right | 2.4 km || 
|-id=985 bgcolor=#d6d6d6
| 495985 ||  || — || October 15, 2007 || Kitt Peak || Spacewatch ||  || align=right | 3.4 km || 
|-id=986 bgcolor=#fefefe
| 495986 ||  || — || September 14, 2007 || Mount Lemmon || Mount Lemmon Survey || NYS || align=right data-sort-value="0.71" | 710 m || 
|-id=987 bgcolor=#FA8072
| 495987 ||  || — || October 9, 2007 || Kitt Peak || Spacewatch ||  || align=right data-sort-value="0.62" | 620 m || 
|-id=988 bgcolor=#E9E9E9
| 495988 ||  || — || October 8, 2007 || Kitt Peak || Spacewatch ||  || align=right | 1.4 km || 
|-id=989 bgcolor=#fefefe
| 495989 ||  || — || October 11, 2007 || Kitt Peak || Spacewatch ||  || align=right data-sort-value="0.72" | 720 m || 
|-id=990 bgcolor=#fefefe
| 495990 ||  || — || October 7, 2007 || Catalina || CSS || NYS || align=right data-sort-value="0.65" | 650 m || 
|-id=991 bgcolor=#fefefe
| 495991 ||  || — || October 16, 2007 || Catalina || CSS ||  || align=right data-sort-value="0.85" | 850 m || 
|-id=992 bgcolor=#fefefe
| 495992 ||  || — || September 9, 2007 || Mount Lemmon || Mount Lemmon Survey || NYS || align=right data-sort-value="0.65" | 650 m || 
|-id=993 bgcolor=#d6d6d6
| 495993 ||  || — || October 16, 2007 || Mount Lemmon || Mount Lemmon Survey || EUP || align=right | 3.8 km || 
|-id=994 bgcolor=#E9E9E9
| 495994 ||  || — || October 10, 2007 || Mount Lemmon || Mount Lemmon Survey ||  || align=right data-sort-value="0.68" | 680 m || 
|-id=995 bgcolor=#d6d6d6
| 495995 ||  || — || October 16, 2007 || Catalina || CSS ||  || align=right | 3.6 km || 
|-id=996 bgcolor=#fefefe
| 495996 ||  || — || November 1, 2007 || Kitt Peak || Spacewatch || H || align=right data-sort-value="0.86" | 860 m || 
|-id=997 bgcolor=#FA8072
| 495997 ||  || — || November 4, 2007 || Catalina || CSS ||  || align=right | 2.2 km || 
|-id=998 bgcolor=#d6d6d6
| 495998 ||  || — || November 3, 2007 || Kitt Peak || Spacewatch ||  || align=right | 2.6 km || 
|-id=999 bgcolor=#d6d6d6
| 495999 ||  || — || October 19, 2007 || Anderson Mesa || LONEOS ||  || align=right | 3.5 km || 
|-id=000 bgcolor=#E9E9E9
| 496000 ||  || — || September 10, 2007 || Mount Lemmon || Mount Lemmon Survey ||  || align=right data-sort-value="0.76" | 760 m || 
|}

References

External links 
 Discovery Circumstances: Numbered Minor Planets (495001)–(500000) (IAU Minor Planet Center)

0495